An exonym is a place name, used by non-natives of that place, that differs from the official or native name for that place. Turkish has a wealth of exonyms in areas beyond the current borders of Turkey notably those that were once part of Ottoman Empire and its vassals and tributaries or within the Turkish, Ottoman, or a Turkic sphere of cultural or economic influence. In addition, Turkish sometimes renders the names of other cities in a phonetic Turkish spelling, e.g., Chicago as Şikago or Manchester as Mançester.  As these forms are not commonly used in Turkish, there is not a systematic attempt to include them here.

Cities are grouped by country and then listed alphabetically by their current best-known name in English. The English version is followed by Turkish variants in order of significance. A blue asterisk generally indicates the availability of a Turkish Wikipedia article for that city under that name which may also provide additional reference for the equivalence.

Afghanistan

Albania

Algeria

Andorra

Armenia

Austria

Azerbaijan

Belarus

Belgium

Bosnia-Herzegovina
Ahmići Ahmiç, Ahmiçi, Ahmici
Banja Luka Bana Luka, Banaluka, Benaluka, Bonoluka, Banbaloka, Baniyaluka
Bastasi Paşaova
Bihać Bihke, Behke, Bihaç, Beke, Bihka, Vihiç
Bijeljina Biyelina, Beline, Belene, Biline
Bileća Bileke, Bileka, Bilika, Bileyke
Blagaj Bulagay, Balagay, Blagay, Bolagay
Bosanska Krajina Karayn
Bosanska Krupa Krupa, Koropa, Kurpa
Bosanska Otoka Ada-i Kebir
Bosanski Petrovac Petrovaç
Brčko Berçka, Breçka
Brnjaci Hacımustafahan
Brod Bosnabuyuncik, Bosnaboyuncuk, Brot, Burut
Bugojno Akhisar, Bugoyna, Bugoyna-Akhisar
Čajniče Çayniça, Çaniça, Çayniçe, Çayniçse, Caniçse
Cazin Sazin
Cernica Çereniçse
Čitluk Çitlik
Derventa Derbent, Derbend
Đevanje, Zvornik Yenihan
Doboj Doboy, Doboya
Donja Koprivna Körpine
Donji Vakuf Vakıf, Vakf, Üskopya Vakfı
Drina Dirin, Drina
Drvar Dırvar
Dubica Dubiçe, Dubniçse, Dubiça, Dobnisa
Foča Güzelhisar, Foça
Fojnica Foyniça, Foyniçe, Foynika, Foniçse
Gabela Gıble, Gabele, Sedislam
Gacko Gaçka, Gaçga
Glamoč Gulamuç, Belgradçık
Golobrđe Koliborg
Goražde Gorajde
Gračanica Graçaniça
Gradačac Gradaçaç
Gradiška Gradişka, Gradcaş, Gradiçka, Berbir, Kradişka, Gıradişka
Gubin Ataağakule
Halapić Halepkule
Han Pijesak Pisakhan
Herzegovina Hersek, Herceçovin
Hodidjed Hodidede, Aktabya
Ilidža Ilıca
Jablanica Yablanika
Jajce Yayçe, Yayça, Yayıhbisa
Jezero Gölhisar, Göl Hisar
Kakanj Kakan, Kakanya
Karakaj Karakaya
Kladanj Kaladine, Kladna, Kladine, Kaladina, Kalavine
Ključ, Gacko Köylüç
Ključ, Una-Sana Canton Klivaç, Kluç, Köluyc
Konjic Koniça, Koniçe
Koprivno Körpine
Kostajnica Kosdaniçse, Kostaniçe, Kostaniça, Kostayniça
Kotor Varoš Kotor
Kozarac Kozarçe, Kozarsa
Kozluk Kozluk
Kulen Vakuf Cisr-i Kebir
Kupres Köprüs
Livno İhlevne, İhlivne, Hilevne, Mustafabeyşehir
Ljubinje Lubin, Labin
Ljubuški Lubuşka
Maglaj Maglay, Magley, Maglaya
Maslovare Zeytinhisar
Miljacka Milaçka nehri
Mokro Mokra
Mostar Mostar, Köprü Hisar
Mrkonjić Grad Musafir, Varcar Vakuf, Varcar Vakıf, Varsal Vakıf, Yeni Yayçe
Mrnjići Mirniçe
Neretva Nertiva, Tertova
Neum Neum
Nevesinje Novasin, Nevesin, Nevasin, Novesin
Nova Kasaba Yeni Kasaba
Novi Grad Novi, Novin, Novograd, Norograd
Odžak Ocak
Olovo Olofça, Olofçe
Ostrovica Ostroviçe, Ostrofça, Osrovisa
Pale Boğazıyumru
Pećigrad Mihalpekler
Počitelj Poçitel, Poçitelli, Poçetel
Podgrađe Sarayköy
Podrašnica, Mrkonjić Grad Osmaniye
Podravno Derbent
Podžeplje Çelebipazar
Prača Çatalca, Praka
Predolje Dol
Pribelja Yenikule
Prijedor Pridor
Prnjavor Prinyavor
Prozor Prozor, Akhisar
Prusac Akhisar, Prusak
Radimlja Radimli
Rogatica Çelebipazar, Çelebi Pazar, Rogatika
Rudo Roda
Šamac Aziziye
Sanski Most Saneskimoşet, Vakıf, Vakuf, Cisr-i Sana
Sarajevo Saraybosna, Bosnasaray, Sarayova, Sarayhisar, Saray, Seray
Baščaršija Başçarşı
Šargovac Şarkova, Şarkovası
Simin Han Simin Han, Siminhan
Skender Vakuf Vakf-ı İskender
Sokolac Sokol, Sokul
Sokolovići Sokol, Sokul
Srbac İşvinar, İsvinyar
Srebrenica Serbernice, Srepniçe, Serebence, Srebrenik, Srebrenice
Srebrenik Srebrenik, Srebernik
Stari Majdan Eski Meydan, Eskimaden, Maden-i Atik
Stolac İstolça, Ustulçe, Ustulca
Šubin Şubin
Tešanj Teşne, Teşene, Tişne, Tesanya, Teşanya
Teslić Tesliç
Tomislavgrad Dumna, Duvna, Duvno, Seddicedid, Seddi Cedid
Travnik Travnik, Vizirtravnik, Trafnik, Vizirtrafnik
Trebinje Trebinye, Tirebin
Tuzla Tuzla, Kızılca Tuzla
Ulog Oluk
Ustikolina Üstikolina
Vareš Varsa
Velika Kladuša Kladoş-i Kebîr, Kladuşa
Višegrad Vişegrad, Viçgrad, Vizegrad, Vişigrad
Visoko Visoka, Vizoko, Vizoka
Vitez Vitez
Vlasenica Vlaseniçe
Vranduk İvranduk
Vrbanja Virbanya
Vrbas (river) Virbaza deresi, Virbas, Söğütsuyu
Zavidovići Yenişehir
Zenica Zeniça, Zenca, Zenika
Žepa Zepa
Žepče Zepçe, Sebze
Živinice Memlahatun
Zvornik İzvornik, Çornik

Bulgaria

Central Asia
Amu Darya Ceyhun, Amu Derya
Aral Sea Aral Gölü, Turan Denizi, Sir Denizi, Harzem Denizi
Caspian Sea Hazar Denizi, Bahr-i Taberistan, Bahr-i Cürcan, Bahr-i Deylem, Harizm Denizi, Kuzgun Denizi, Bahr-i Hazer, Hazer Denizi
Fergana Valley Fergana Vadisi
Silk Road İpek Yolu
Syr Darya Seyhun, İnci Nehri, Sirderya, Siri Derya
Transoxiana Maveraünnehir, Çay Ardı, Bilad el-Türk
Turkestan Türkistan

Chad

China

Comoros
Comoros Kamer Adaları, Kamur, Kumur, Komor, Mefta Adaları
Grande Comore Kazice
Mayotte Magota
Mohéli Muali

Croatia
Babina Greda Babagerenda
Bakar Bakır, Bukarica
Baška Başka
Bjelovar Belovar, Belvar
Bošnjaci Boşnak
Brač Brasa, Bıraç, Brast
Branjin Vrh Baranvar, Baranavar, Birnivar, Baranyavar
Brezovica Brezoviçe
Čakovec Çakatorna, Çakotorna
Cavtat Raguzaveko, Apidaros, Apidarosk
Čazma Çazma, Zaçesne, Zaçisne, Zaçasna, Zacisne
Čepin Çepin
Cerna Çerna
Cernik Çernik
Cetina Zitna, Çitna, Çetina
Čiovo Bova
Cres Karsu, Carsu, Şerso, Karso
Croatia Hırvatistan, Hırvatlık, Krovaçiya
Đakovo Diyakova, Yakova
Dalj Dal, Dalya
Dalmatia Dalmaçya, Dalmaça, Dalmasiya
Darda Darda, Tarda, Tarta
Daruvar Daruvar
Drava Tırava, Dırava
Dubrovnik Dobravenedik, Dubrovnik, Raguza, Ragoza, Dobruca, Dobrovenik, Dubrevonik, Dobro Venedik, Dobravenik, Dubrevunik
Erdut Erdud, Erdöd
Gorjani Goryan, Garay
Gundinci Gundinçi, Gundinçe, Kundiç
Hrastovac Harastoviç
Hrvatska Kostajnica Kostaniçe, Kostayniça
Hvar Lezine, Far
Ilok Uyluk, Aylok, Oyluk, Oluk, İlok
Islam Latinski & Islam Grčki Setislam, Sedd-Islam, Sedd-i Islam, Saddislam
Istria İstriya, İstra, İstirya
Ivankovo İvankova
Jablanac Yayıgaca
Jasenovac Yasenoviçse, Yesanofça
Karlovac Karloçe, Karilştad
Klis Kilis, Klis-i Bosna, Kilis-i Bosna, Klise, Kilissa
Knin Kanin, Kinin, Tinin, Tenin, Tetina
Koprivnica Koproniça, Kapronca, Koproniçi, Kopranisa
Korčula Korsile, Korşol, Korçoli, Kurçula, Korçula
Krbava Korbava, Kırbava, Krbava
Križevci Kirzeviçe
Krk Vage, Veliya, Vake
Krka Kırka, Fırka, Kerka, Korka
Kula Norinska Norin
Kupa Kulpa nehri, Kolpa
Kutjevo Kutheva
Kvarner Gulf Karnaro Körfezi, Karnero Körfezi
Labin Albona
Lastovo Agosta, Langoza, Lagosta
Legrad Lağradcık, Legradcık, Ligratçık
Liburnia Leyborina
Lokrum İskopo, Kiroma
Lopud Mizo, Mezzo
Lošinj Luşin, Luzine
Lovran Lorana
Lovrijenac Loronciya
Makarska Meraksa
Međimurje Mekemorya, Mimuriye, Mimuriyye, Megmorya, Megemorya, Megümurye, Megümürye, Megümurya, Muraköz
Medulin Medelun
Mikleuš Mikloş
Mlini Muline
Mljet Melide, Meleda, Milida, Malidar, Melita, Malta
Molat Çam Pontal
Molunat Malente, Molonta, Malonte, Malinte
Moslavina Maslovin, Muslovine
Našice Nekçe
Nijemci Nemçe, Nemçi, Nimçe, Nemse
Novigrad Sitenova, Site Nova
Novi Zrin Zerinvar, Serinvar, Yenikale, Yanık
Nuštar Nuştra
Obrovac Obrovaç
Omiš Almiba, Umuş
Opatija Parluka, Abbasiye
Orahovica Rahoviçe, Raholca, Rehaviçe
Orebić Çilo
Osijek Ösek, Cisr-i Ösek, Özek, Ösik
Osor Orsaro
Pag Pagu
Pakrac Pakriç, Pakraç, Pakriçsa
Pelješac Sabyon
Perušić Perüşik
Petrinja Yenihisar, Petrina, Petrinye, Petrinya
Podgorač Podgoraç, Podgoriçe, Podgoriye, Podgrad
Poreč Piranse, Piransa, Branse, Pranse
Posavski Podgajci Posaviye, Posovye
Pozega Pojega, Poşega, Pocega
Premuda Piremude, Premode
Pula Pola
Rab Ezni, Arba, Arbe
Rijeka Feyomi, Fiyumi, Riyeka, Fiyume
Rječina Feyomi
Rogoznica Rogozniçe
Rovinj Ruvinye, Rovine
Senj Sanyaba, Sanya, Sen, Sina, Sin, Seng, Zeng, Senya
Šipan Volobana, Luppana
Sisak Siska, Sisek, Sissak
Šibenik Şebnik, Şebenik, Şibenik, Şibenek, Şibeniko
Sikirevci Sikireviçe
Škarda Sam Paru Damanu, İşkarda, Sam Paro
Skradin İskaradin, İskradin, İskardin, İskiradin, İskıradin, İşkardona, Iskardona, Skardona
Slatina Islatine, Islatinik
Slavonia Islavon, İslavonya, İşlavoniya, İsklavon, Iskalavonya, Soklavonya, İslavinye, İslevinye
Slavonski Brod Desbot, Burudi, Despot-i Brod
Slavonski Šamac Şapiça
Slunj Sluni, Sluin, Slovin
Solin Salona, Solone
Split İspelet, İspelit, İspilit, İspilet, Spilit
Štitar Iştitar, İştitar, Çitar
Ston İstanyo
Stupčanica Istupçaniçe
Sveti Andrija Dendarin, Sen Andirya
Tovarnik Tovarnik
Trogir Tırav, Tarav
Trpanj Tiripina
Udbina Udvinye, Udvine
Umag Omago, Umagu, Umago
Unije Uniye
Valpovo Valpo, Valpova, Valpove
Varaždin Versedin, Varaşdin, Varajdin, Varazdın
Velebit Channel Morlaka
Veruda Ulamusalu, Ulu Musalı
Vinkovci Vinkofçe
Virovitica Virovitiçe
Vis Lise, Liza
Voćin Atana
Vrana Avrana, Orana
Vrhovine Virhovine
Vrpile Vırpile
Vrsar Orsara, Orsera
Vukovar Valkovar, Vılkovar, Vukovar, Vulko, Volkovar
Zadar Cara, Zadire, Zara, Zadra
Zagreb Zagrep, Agram, Zağreb, Garabiya, Garabya
Zdenci İzdençe
Županja Jupaniye

Cuba
Cuba Küba, Kübed
Havana Havana, Habana

Cyprus
Northern Cyprus Kuzey Kıbrıs
Gazimağusa District Gazimağusa İlçesi
Acheritou Güvercinlik, Aşeritu, Aşarido, Aşeridu, Aheridu, Ahridye, Çiftlik-i Çömlekçi, Çömlekçi Çiftliği
Achna Düzce, Ahna
Agios Chariton Ergenekon, Ayharida, Ayharita, Ayaharido, Bayraktar
Agios Memnon Ayamemnon, Ağamemnon, Agamemnon
Agios Nikolaos Yamaçköy, Yamaç, Aynikola
Agios Nikolaos, SBA Akbulut, Aynikola, Aya Nikola (part of British base)
Agios Sergios Yeni Boğaziçi, Yeniboğaziçi, Aysergi
Akanthou Tatlısu, Akatu
Afrodision Afrodizyon
Agia Marina Kalograias Küçükerenköy
Agios Nikolaos Bahçeler
Neraidhes Yalı, Nerayides
Aloda Atlılar, Aloda
Angastina Aslanköy, Arslanköy, Angastina, Ankastina, Ankastine
Artemi Arıdamı, Artemi, Artimi
Mersiniki Mersiniki, Mersinlik
Asha Paşaköy, Paşa, Aşa, Aşşa, Aşke
Cape Glossa Glossa Burnu
Cape Caraolos Karakol Burnu, Karaoğlu, Karaolos, Karağulos
Enkomi Tuzla, Engomi
Famagusta Gazimağusa, Gazimagosa, Mağusa, Magosa
Gaidouras Korkuteli, Gaydura
Genagra Nergisli, Nergizli, Yenağra, Yenagra, Yenokra, Yanagra
Goufes Çamlıca, Küfez, Kufez, Gufes, Kepez
Gypsou Akova, Yipsos, İpsos, Yipsu, İpsoz, Gipsos
Kalopsida Çayönü, Galopsida, Kalepsides, Kalopsida, Kalopsido
Kato Deryneia Aşağı Derinköy, Aşağı Derinya
Knodara Gönendere, Gonedra, Konetra, Konedra, Gönenden, Knodora
Kontea Türkmenköy, Gondeya, Kondeya
Kornokipos Görneç
Kouklia Köprülü, Köprü, Kukla
Lefkoniko Geçitkale, Lefkonuk, Lefkonik
Limnia Mormenekşe, Limya
Lysi Akdoğan, Lisi
Makrasyka İncirli, Makrasiga, Makrasika
Maratha Muratağa, Marata, Murata
Marathovounos Ulukışla, Marotovuno, Maratoğno, Maratogni
Melounta Mallıdağ, Melunda, Malunda
Milia Yıldırım, Milya, Miliya
Mousoulita Kurudere, Musulida, Musulita, Musilide
Pergamos Beyarmudu, Pergama, Bergama (previously part of Larnaca District)
Peristeronopigi Alaniçi, Piyi Peristerona, Pi Peristerona, Piperisterona, Peristerona Piyi
Peristerona Ovacık
Pigi Alaniçi, Piyi
Platani Çınarlı, Bladan, Platan
Prastio Dörtyol, Prastyo, Brasyo
Psyllatos Sütlüce, İpsillat
Pyla Pile
Pyrga Pirhan, Pirga
Salamis Salamis
Santalaris Sandallar, Sandallaris
Sinta İnönü, Sındırgı, Sinde, Sinda
Strongylos Turunçlu, Istroncilo, İstroncilo, Stroncilo, İstroncolo, İstironcalu
Strovilia Akyar (part of British base)
Stylloi Mutluyaka, İstilos, Stilos, Stillos
Trypimeni Tirmen, Tiremenitşe, Tirmenteşe, Tripimeni
Tziaos (Kiados) Serdarlı, Çatoz, Çatos, Çatuz
Varosha Maraş, Kapalı Maraş, Marasa, Varoş
Vatili Vadili
Vitsada Pınarlı, Viçada, Vidsada, Vitsada, Viçsada
Girne District Girne İlçesi
Agia Eirini Akdeniz, Ayarini, Ayrini, Aya İrini
Agios Amvrosios Esentepe, Aykuruş, Ay Kuruş, Aya Koroş, Ayoz Amrosyos
Agios Epiktitos Çatalköy, Ayapihtido, Ay Epiktitos
Agios Ermolaos Şirinevler, Ayermola, Ayarmola, Ayermela, Ermola
Agios Georgios Karaoğlanoğlu, Ayorgi, Ayyorgi, Ayyori, Ayagoros, Aya Yorgi
Agios Fanourios Maviyalı, Mavi Yalı
Agirda Ağırdağ, Ağırda, Agirda
Agridaki Alemdağ, Ağırdaki, Ağirlaki, Agirlaki, Ağirdaci, Agridaci, Afrikaka
Asomatos Özhan, Asomato, Asomota, Asomoda, Asomados, Asamato (former Maronite village)
Bellapais Beylerbeyi, Bellabayıs, Balâbayis
Bogazi Keryneias Boğazköy
Tziklos Çiklos, Ciklos
Buffavento Castle Buffavento Kalesi, Bufavento
Cape Akhiropietos Aşeropiyito Burnu, Ahiroplitos Burnu, Yeşiltepe Burnu
Cape Kormakitis Koruçam Burnu, Kormacit Burnu
Cape Stazousa Dikburun, Dik Burnu, Stazusa Burnu
Cape Vavilas Güzelyalı Burnu, Vavila Burnu
Charkeia Karaağaç, Harce, Harca, Harça, Harga
Dikomo Dikmen, Dikomi, Digomo, Dikomo
Alonagra Alonağra
Diorios Tepebaşı, Yorgoz, Yorgos, Yorkes, Dihoryo, Diorgo
Elia Yeşiltepe, Elya, Elye, Elefteriha
Fotta Dağyolu, Foda, Fota, Hota
Ftericha Ilgaz, İfterika, Fderiha, Ptriha
Kalograia Bahçeli, Kallurga, Kalturga, Kalogreya, Kallorka
Kampyli Hisarköy, Hanbeli, Gambilli, Kambilli, Kambili, Kanili (former Maronite village)
Karmi Karaman, Karmi
Karpaseia Karpaşa, Karpasa (Maronite village)
Karakoumi Karakum, Karakomi
Karavas Alsancak, Karava
Lambousa Lambusa
Kazafani Ozanköy, Gazafana, Kazafana, Kasaphan, Gazibafan
Kiomourtzou Kömürcü, Kömürce, Kömürcük
Klepini Arapköy, Arapköyü, Arap, Arab, Klapin, Klepini
Kontemenos Kılıçaslan, Kılıçarslan, Kördemen, Kördümen, Köndemen, Gördümen
Kormakitis Koruçam, Kormacit, Karmakidi (Maronite village)
Koutsovendis Güngör, Kutsovendi, Kutsevendi, Kutsavondi
Krini Pınarbaşı, Gırnı, Kırnı, Kirni, Karni, Kırini
Kyrenia Girne, Girniye, Girinye, Girine, Kerine, Cirene, Kirine
Kyrenia Mountains (Pentadaktylos) Beşparmak Dağları, Girne Dağları, Cireneler
Lapithos Lapta
Larnakas tis Lapithou Kozan, Kozanköy, Larnaka, Larnaka dis Lapityu
Livera Sadrazamköy, Livera
Motides İncesu, Modiyes, Mathides
Myrtou Çamlıbel, Mirtu, Mirti
Pigadhes Sanctuary Pigades Tapınağı
Orga Kayalar, Orga
Palaiókastro Eskikale, Palyokastro
Palaiosofos Malatya, Maltya, Balyosofo, Balyasofo, Paleosofo, Paleosofos, Paleosofas
Panagra Geçitköy, Panağra
Pileri Göçeri, Bilelle, Pileri
Platymatis Gözübüyük, Bladimat, Platimati
Alagadi Beach Alakadın, Alakadı, Alakadi, Alagadi, Alakati
Saint Hilarion Castle Aziz Hilaryon Kalesi, Sent Hilaryon, Sen Hilaryon
Sychari Kaynakköy, Aşağı Taşkent, Sihari, Sahari, Sinhari
Aspro Mutti Bozdağ
Sysklipos Akçiçek, Siskilip, İsglibo, Sisglibo
Templos Zeytinlik, Temroz, Temploz, Templos, Temlos
Thermeia Doğanköy, Termiye, Termiya
Trapeza Beşparmak, Teknecik, Trabbeza, Trabeza, Trapeza, Trepuze, Trabezunda
Vourkaris Vurgari, Vorkaris, Vikla, Viklas
Trimithi Edremit, Erdemit, Tirmit, Tirmif
Vasileia Karşıyaka, Vasilya
Vavilas Güzelyalı, Gözelyalı, Vavila
Vouno Yukarı Taşkent, Taşkent, Vuno, Voni, Vunos
Güzelyurt District Güzelyurt İlçesi (previously part of Nicosia District)
Argaki Akçay, Akça, Argaca, Argaci, Arkaca, Arkacı, Argaka
Avlona Gayretköy, Avlona, Uluna
Chrysiliou Yuvacık, Hırisilya, Hrisilyu
Dyo Potamoi İkidere, İki Dere, Diyobodami, Diopotamas
Fyllia Serhatköy, Serhadköy, Filya, Filiya
Kapouti (Kalo Chorio Morphou) Kalkanlı, Gabudi, Kapudi, Kaputi, Kalohoryo, Kaloheryo
Toumba tou Skourou Tumba tu Skuru
Katokopia Zümrütköy, Gadagobya, Gadagopya, Gadakopya, Katakopya, Kakopetya, Katokopya
Kyra Mevlevi, Mevleviköy, Cira, Cera, Kira
Masari Şahinler, Masari
Morphou Güzelyurt, Morfu, Morfo, Omorfo, Omorfi, Omorfa
Nikitas Güneşköy, Nikita
Prastio Aydınköy, Aydınlı, Pırastyo, Prastyo, Prasko, Praşkü
Syrianochori Yayla, Yalya, Siryanahor, Siryanohori, Siryonohori, Siryonoköyü, Kumköy
Zodeia Bostancı, Zodya, Zotya, Yukarı ve Aşağı Bostancı, Yukarı ve Aşağı Zodya, Ana ve Kado Zodya, Ano ve Kato Zodya
Kato Zodeia Aşağı Bostancı, Aşağı Zodya, Kado Zodya, Kato Zodya, Kato Zotya
Pano Zodeia Yukarı Bostancı, Yukarı Zodya, Ana Zodya, Ano Zodya, Ano Zotya, Pano Zodya, Pano Zotya
İskele District İskele İlçesi (previously part of Famagusta District)
Agia Trias Sipahi, Aytirya, Ayatrias, Aytriada, Aytrias
Agios Andronikos Yeşilköy, Ayantroniko, Ayandroniko, Aya Andreniko
Agios Andronikos (Topsioukeuy) Topçuköy, Ay Andronigo
Agios Efstathios Zeybekköy, Ayistat, Ayisdat, Ayevstat, Ayastad, Ayostasi
Agios Filon Monastery Ayfilon Manastırı, Ay Filon Manastırı
Agios Georgios Aygün, Ayyorgi, Aya Yorgi
Agios Iakovos Altınova, Aynakofo
Agios Ilias Yarköy, Ayiliya, Ayilya, Ay Elya
Agios Symeon Avtepe, Aytepe, Aysimen, Ay Simen, Aysinyo, Aysimyo
Agios Theodoros Çayırova, Otluk, Aytodori, Aytotoro, Aytotro, Aya Todori
Apostolos Andreas Monastery Havari Andreas Manastırı, Ayandreya Manastırı, Apostolandreya Manastırı, Ayabostoli
Ardana Ardahan, Ardana
Arnadi Kuzucuk, Arnayi, Arnai
Avgolida Kurtuluş, Avgalida
Bogazi Trikomou Boğaz
Cape Apostolos Andreas Zafer Burnu, Karpuz Burnu, Ayandreya Burnu, Ayandrea Burnu, Abosdolo Andrea, Andreya Burnu, Andrea Burnu, Apostolo Andrea Burnu
Cape Chelones Helones Burnu
Cape Galounopetra İyitaş Burnu, İğitaş, Galunopedra Burnu, Galunopetra Ucu
Cape Elaia Zeytin Burnu, Ayılı Burnu, Ayılıburun, Elya Burnu, İliya Burnu, İlya Burnu
Cape Lembos Işık Burnu, Işıkburun
Cape Melissakros Kasa Burnu
Cape Pachyammos Paçiammo Burnu, Paşiammo Burnu
Cape Palloura Koyuntaşı Burnu, Balurya Burnu
Cape Plakoti Yassıburun, Yassı Burnu, Işıkburun, Pilakoti Burnu
Cape Proti Proti Burnu, İlkburun
Davlos Kaplıca, Davlos, Davlo, Davsos
Eptakomi Yedikonuk, Eptagomi, Eptakomi, Eftagomi
Flamoudi Mersinlik, Flamuda, Flamudi, Flamodi
Galateia Mehmetçik, Galatya
Galinoporni Kaleburnu, Galinopurni, Galinoporni, Kalinoporni
Gastria Kalecik, Gastriya, Gastirya
Gerani Turnalar, Yerani
Gialousa Yeni Erenköy, Maltepe, Yalusa
Agios Thyrsos Aytirsos
Golden Beach (Pachyammos) Altınkum Sahili
Kantara Kantara
Kantara Castle Kantara Kalesi
Karpass Peninsula Karpaz Yarımadası, Kırpaşa Yarımadası, Karpaşa Yarımadası
Aphendrika Afendrika
Karpasia Karpaz, Karpas
Klidhes Islands Kordilek Adaları, Kordilya Adaları, Zafer Adaları, Kilit Adaları, Klides
Koilanemos Esenköy, Cilanemo, Gilanemos, Kilanemos, Kilanimos
Koma tou Gialou Kumyalı, Kumyalık, Komyalık
Komi Kebir Büyükkonuk, Büyük Konuk, Komikebir, Komi Kebir, Gomikebir
Koroveia Kuruova, Korovya
Krideia Kilitkaya, Kridya, Kritya
Lapathos Boğaziçi, Lapatos, Lapatoz
Leonarisso Ziyamet, Zeamet, Ziamet, Leyonares, Leonarisos, Leonariso, Legonarisso, Leonarisso
Livadia Sazlıköy, Livadya, Livatya
Lythrangomi Boltaşlı, Litrengomi, Litrangomi
Mandres Ağıllar, Mandrez, Mondras
Melanagra Adaçay, Melanarga, Niyagara
Monarga Boğaztepe, Deregeçit, Dağgeçit, Monarka, Monarga, Motarfa
Neta Taşlıca, Neda, Neta
Ovgoros Ergazi, Ovgoroz
Patriki Tuzluca, Batrıç, Patriç, Padriki
Perivolia tou Trikomou Bahçeler
Platanissos Balalan, Planadinissa, Pladanisyo, Platanise
Rizokarpaso Dipkarpaz, Diskarpas, Rizokarpazo, Rizokarpaso
Spathariko Ötüken, İspahariko, Ispaharigo, Espatariko, Spatarigo, Spathariko
Sygkrasi Sınırüstü, Gölbaşı, Singrasi
Tavros Pamuklu, Tavro, Tavros
Trikomo İskele, Yeni İskele, Trikoma, Trikomo
Cevizli Cevizli
Vasili Gelincik, Vasili
Vathylakas Derince, Vatilakka, Vatilakas, Vatilakos, Vudilaka, Vunilaka, Vunilika, Dutlaka
Vokolida Bafra, Vogolida, Vokalida, Vokolida, Vokolya, Vokolyo
Lefke District Lefke İlçesi (previously part of Nicosia District)
Agios Georgios Lefkas Madenliköy, Madenköy, Ayyorgi, Ayyorgi Solya, Ayorgo, Aya Yorgi Yoro
Agios Nikolaos Lefkas (Agios Nikolaos Soleas) Aynikola
Ammadies Günebakan, Amadyez, Amargez
Ampelikou Bağlıköy, Ambeligu, Ambeliku, Embaliko, Anbaliku
Angolemi Taşpınar, Angolem
Apliki Aplıç, Apliç
Cape Kokkina Erenköy Burnu, Koççina Burnu
Cape Limnitis Limniti Burnu, Yeşilırmak Burnu
Elia Doğancı, Elye
Galini Ömerli, Galini
Kalo Chorio Çamlıköy, Galohoryo, Kalohoryo
Karavostasi Gemikonağı, Gemigonağı
Kazivera Gaziveren, Gaziveran, Gazviran
Kokkina Erenköy, Goççina, Koççina
Lefka Lefke, Lefka, Lefge
Akentou (Aqua De Cento) Acendu
Limnitis Yeşilırmak, Limnidi, Limniti
Giouroukkeuy Yörükköy
Loutros Bademliköy, Lutro, Lutros
Pentageia Yeşilyurt, Pendaye, Pendaya
Peristeronari Cengizköy, Perisderonari, Peristeronari, Peristeron, Narlıköy
Petra Taşköy, Petre, Bedre
Potamos tou Kampou Yedidalga, Gambo, Bodamus du Gambu, Potamos du Gambo, Kambu Deresi
Selemani (Agios Ioannis of Tylliria) Süleymaniye
Soli Soli, Solya
Variseia Şirinköy, Varişa, Varisa, Varuşa
Vouni Palace Vuni Sarayı
Xeros Denizli, İksero, Ksero
Xerovounos Kurutepe, Kurttepe, Yukarı Yeşilırmak, İkserovuno, Kserovuno
Lefkoşa District Lefkoşa İlçesi
Afania Gaziköy, Afanya (previously part of Famagusta District)
Ornithi Tavukçu, Tavukçu Çiftliği, Tatlı Su, Ekmekçiler, Ornuda, Orunta, Ornuta, Ornita, Orniti
Agia Dilekkaya, Ayakebir, Aya, Agakebir, Aya Kebir
Agia Marina Gürpınar, Aymarina, Ay Marina (Maronite village)
Agios Vasileios Türkeli, Ayvasıl, Ayvasil
Arsos Yiğitler, Arçoz, Altınözü (previously part of Larnaca District)
Beykeuy Beyköy
Epicho Cihangir, Abuhor, Abohor, Aboher, Ebiho
Exometochi Düzova, Eksomedoş
Gerolakkos Alayköy, Yerolaggo, Yerolakko, Yeralaköz, Eskikuyu
Kalyvakia Kalavaç, Galavaç
Kanli Kanlıköy
Kioneli Gönyeli, Konyalı, Gönelli
Yenikent Yenikent
Kourou Monastiri Çukurova, Kuru Manastır, Kurumanastır, Guru Manasdır
Kythrea Değirmenlik, Kitreya
Louroujina Akıncılar, Lurucina, Luricina, Lûricina, Kızılveren
Margo Kargı, Margo
Melouseia Kırıkkale, Meluşa, Melüşa, Melusa (previously part of Larnaca District)
Mora Meriç, Mora, Morköy
Neo Chorio Minareliköy, Minareli Köy, Neohoryo
Nicosia Lefkoşa, Lefkoşe, Kuzey Lefkoşa
Abdi Çavuş Abdi Çavuş
Abou Kavouk Akkavuk, Ak Kavuk, Ebu Kavuk
Barbaro Bastion Musalla Burcu
Arab Ahmet Arap Ahmet, Arab Ahmed, Arabahmet, Arapahmet, Arabahmedpaşa
Ayia Sofia Selimiye, Ayasofya
Ayios Dhometios (Turkish Part) Aydemet, Aya Demet, Metehan
Ayios Loukas Ayyıldız, Ayluka
Ayios Kassianos Kafesli, Aykasyano
Çağlayan Çağlayan
Gelibolu Gelibolu
Geni Tzami Yenicami, Yeni Cami
Göçmenköy Göçmenköy
Hamit Mandres Hamitköy, Hamit Mandıra, Hamit Mandrez, Mandırez, Mandrez
Haydar Pasha Haydarpaşa
İbrahimpaşa İbrahimpaşa
Kyrenia Gate (Porta del Proveditore) Girne Kapısı, Edirne Kapı
Iplik Bazar–Korkut Effendi İplikpazarı – Korkut Efendi
Karamanzade Karamanzade
Paphos Gate (Porta San Domenico) Baf Kapısı
Keushk Chiftlik (Tabana) Köşklüçiftlik, Tabakhane, Tabana
Kumsal Kumsal
Ledra Street (north part) Lokmacı Caddesi, Uzun Yol, Uzunyol, Cinayet Mili, Ledra, Lidra, Lokmacı Karşısı
Mahmutpaşa Mahmutpaşa
Marmara Marmara
Mia Milia Haspolat, Birincimil, Miyamilya, Miamilya
Neapoli Yenişehir
Omorphita Küçük Kaymaklı, Küçükkaymaklı
Ortakioi (Mintzeli) Ortaköy, Menderes, Minzelli, Minceli
Samanbahçe Samanbahçe
Seragiou Square Sarayönü, Sarayönü Meydanlığı, Atatürk Meydanı, Orduönü, Hükümet Konağı Meydanı, Konak Meydanı
Dereboyu Dereboyu
Shakespeare Avenue Dereboyu Caddesi, Mehmet Akif Caddesi
Taşkınköy Taşkınköy
Trachonas Kızılay, Kızılbaş, Gızılbaş, Kızılbağ, Trahona
Palaikythro Balıkesir, Balıkitre, Balikitre, Balikitire, Palekitre, Palikitro, Palekitron
Petra tou Digeni Yeniceköy, Petra du Diğeni
Pyrogi Gaziler, Piroyi
Skylloura Yılmazköy, Şillura
Trachoni Demirhan, Tirhon, Tirfon, Tarhun, Durhan
Tremetousia Erdemli, Tremeşe, Tremeçe, Tıremeşe, Tremetuşa, Teremişe (previously part of Larnaca District)
Tymbou Kırklar, Ercan, Timbu, Tinbu, Timbo, Dimbo, Kırklar Tekkesi
Chumlchuk (Tsomlektsi Tsiftlik) Çömlekçi, Çömlekçi Çiftlik
Voni Gökhan, Voni
Mesaoria Mesarya, İçova, Orta Çukur, Mesarye, Mesariye, Meserya
Southern Cyprus Kıbrıs Rum Kesimi, Güney Kıbrıs
Famagusta District Gazimağusa (Paralim) İlçesi (south part)
Avgorou Ovguru, Avkoro, Avkaroz
Ayia Napa Aynapa, Aya Napa, Ayanapa
Cape Greco Poyraz Burnu, Greko Burnu, Gıreko Burnu
Dasaki Achnas Ahna Ormanı
Deryneia Derinköy, Derinya
Frenaros Frenaros
Liopetri Liyopetri, Liyopetri
Paralimni Paralim, Paralimni
Protaras Protaras
Sotira Sotira
Vrysoulles Vrisulles
Larnaca District Larnaka (Tuzla) İlçesi
Agia Anna Akhisar, Ayanna, Ayana
Agioi Vavatsinias Ayos, Ayvavatsinya, Ayos Vavatsinya
Agios Theodoros Boğaziçi, Aytotoro, Aytodoro, Aytotro, Kömürlü
Alaminos Aleminyo, Aliminyo, Alaminyo, Alamano, Alamino
Alethriko Aletirko, Aletrigo, Aletriko, Aletirke, Alatirke, Alatirko
Anafotia Akkor, Anafodiya, Anafotya, Ana Fodiye, Ana Fodile, Ano Fodi
Anglisides Aksu, Anglisiya, Angliya
Aplanta Aplanda, Ablanda
Aradippou Aradip
Athienou Kiracıköy, Atyoni
Avdellero Avdeler, Avdelloro
Cape Kiti Çite Burnu, Kite Burnu, Kiti Burnu
Cape Petounda Bedunda Burnu, Pedunda Ucu, Petunda Burnu
Cape Pyla Pile Burnu
Choirokoitia Şirokitya, Hirokitya
Khirokitia Hirokitya
Delikipos Delikipo
Dhekelia Cantonment Dikelya Karargahı (part of British base)
Dromolaxia Mormenekşe, Vromolakşa
Goshi Üçşehitler, Goşşi, Goşi
Hala Sultan Tekke Hala Sultan Tekkesi
Kalavasos Kalavason
Kalo Chorio (Vouda) Vuda, Tülbentli
Kato Drys Kototeri
Kato Lefkara Aşağı Lefkara
Kellia Yıldırım, Celya, Ağılbaş, Çıldır
Kiti Çite, Cite, Kite
Kivisili Cevizli, Civisil
Klavdia Alaniçi, Klavya, Kılavya, Hacı Halil
Kofinou Geçitkale, Köfünye, Bakraçlı
Kornos Korno
Lageia Laye, Laya
Larnaca Larnaka, İskele
Kition Kittim
Larnaca Bay İskele Körfezi, Larnaka Körfezi
Pano Lefkara Lefkara, Banu Lefkara, Yukarı Lefkara
Mari Tatlısu, Mari
Maroni Maroni
Mazotos Mazoto, Mazato, Amazato
Melini Melini
Meneou Menevi
Menogeia Ötüken, Mennoya
Mosfiloti Mosfilodi, Mosfilida, Mosfilidi, Mosfiloti
Odou Odu
Ora Ora
Parsata Barsata, Parsa, Parsada, Parsata
Ormideia Ormidya, Ormidye, Ormidiya
Oroklini (Voroklini) Voroklini, Oroklini
Pervolia Bahçalar, Bahçeler, Pervolya
Petrofani Esendağ, Petrofan
Psematismenos Yalancıköy, Yalancı
Psevdas Psefta, Psevda
Pyrga Çamlıbel, Pirhan, Pirga
Stavrovouni Monastery İstavroz Manastırı
Stavrovouni Mount İstavroz Dağı
Skarinou Iskarinu
Softades Softalar
Tersephanou Tersefan, Tersifan
Tochni Taşkent, Dohni
Troulloi Trulli
Vasilikos Vasiliko
Vavatsinia Vavaçinya, Vavatsinya
Vavla Vavla
Xylofagou Silofagu
Xylotymbou İksilotimbu, İksilotimbo, Ksilotimbo
Zygi Terazi, Ziyi
Limassol District Limasol İlçesi
Agios Amvrosios Ayavras, Ayamvrasiyo
Agios Athanasios Aya Atanaş, Ayatanaş
Agios Dimitrios Aydimitri
Agios Georgios Aya Yorgi
Agios Ioannis Ayo Yanni, Ayyannisi
Agios Konstantinos Ayakonstanti
Agios Mamas Ayamama, Aya Mama, Ayo Mamma
Agios Pavlos Ayo Pavlo
Agios Theodoros Ayo Todro
Agios Therapon Ebtarab
Agios Thomas Mersinli, Mersinlik, Aytuma, Aytoma
Agios Tychonas Ayandihona, Ayandihora
Agridia Ağridya, Ağrıd, Agridye, Agridiya
Agros Ağro, Agro, Agros, Arguz
Akapnou Akabno, Akapnu
Akrotiri Ağrotur, Ağratur, Akrodir
Akrotiri and Dhekelia Ağrotur ve Dikelya (British Sovereign Land)
Akrotiri Bay Limasol Körfezi, Ağrotur Körfezi
Akrotiri Peninsula Ağrotur Yarımadası
Akrounta Akrunda, Akrunta
Alassa Alasya, Alaşya, Alaşiya, Alaso, Halasa
Alektora Gökağaç, Alehtora, Alektora, Çepik
Amathus Amatu
Anogyra Taşlıca, Anoyra, Anoyira
Apesia Apeşa, Abeşa, Apesa, Abesa
Apsiou Abşu, Apşu
Arakapas Arakaba, Arakapa
Armenochori Esenköy, Armenehor, Armenohor
Arsos Arçoz, Arçoz-Limasol, Arsos
Asgata Azgada, Azgata, Asgata
Asomatos Gözügüzel, Asomado, Asomato, Asomatos
Athrakos Atrako
Avdimou Düzkaya, Odim, Evdim, Avdim, Afdimu
Cape Aspro Beyazburun, Beyaz Burun, Beyaz Burnu, Akburun
Cape Dolos Dolo Burnu, Dolos Burnu
Cape Gata Doğan Burnu, Kedi Burnu, Gate Burnu
Cape Zevgari İkizler Burnu, İkizburun
Chandria Handirye, Handriya, Handri, Kandriya
Dierona Diyerona
Dora Dora
Doros Doro, Toru, Zoro
Dymes Dimi, Dimez
Episkopi Yalova, Piskobu, Piskopi, Ebiskobi, Episkopi
Episkopi Bay Yalova Körfezi, Piskobu Körfezi
Episkopi Cantonment Episkopi Karargahı (part of British base)
Eptagoneia Eftagonya, Eptagonya
Erimi Erimi
Fasoula, Limassol Fasula
Foini Fini
Foinikaria Finikarya, Finikari
Gerasa Yerasa
Germasogeia Yermasoy, Yermasoya, Yarmasu
Gerovasa Yerovası, Yerovasa
Kalo Chorio Kalohorka, Galohoryo, Kalohoryo
Kantou Çanakkale, Kandu, Kando
Kapilio Kapilyo
Kato Amiantos Aşağı Amyanto, Aşağı Amiyanto, Aşağı Amyando
Kato Kivides Aşağı Alsandık, Aşağı Civiya, Aşağı Civisil, Aşağı Cevizli
Kato Mylos Kokomilyo, Aşağı Milos
Kato Platres (Tornarides) Tornar, Aşağı Platres
Kato Polemidia Aşağı Binatlı, Aşağı Polemitya, Aşağı Polemidya, Aşağı Polemdiya
Kellaki Kellaki
Klonari Filonari
Koilani Ceylan, Gilân, Cilan
Kolossi Yunus, Burçlu, Goloş, Koloş
Korfi Gorfi, Korfi
Kouka Koka, Kuka
Kourion Kuriyum, Kuryum (part of British Sovereign Land)
Kyperounta Ciberunda, Ciperunda, Kiperunda, Kiperunta
Laneia Lanya
Lemithou Lemito
Limassol Limasol, Leymosun, Leymason, Leymoson, Leymasun, Limason, Lemason
Agia Fyla Aya Fila
Agios Antonios Ayandon, Ayanton, Aya Andoni, Aya Antoni, Aya Anton, Türk Mahallesi
Arnaoutogeitonia Arnavut Mahallesi, Arnabud Mahallesi
Limnatis Limnad, Limnat, Limnatis, Linnatis
Lofou Lof
Louvaras Lugura, Luvara
Malia Bağlarbaşı, Koyunlu, Malya, Malye
Mandria Mandirga, Mandirga-Trodos, Mandriya, Madhari, Madyaru
Mathikoloni Matikoloni, Mathikoloni
Mesa Geitonia Mesavitonya, Mesaytonya
Monagri Manağri, Managri
Monagroulli Monağrul
Moniatis Elmalı, Monyat, Moni
Mount Olympus (Chionistra) Ziyatepe, Şonistra
Mouttagiaka Mutluyaka, Muttayaka, Mutayaka, Mutlayaka, Putayaka
Omodos Omodos
Timios Stavros Monastery Istavro Manastırı
Pachna Bahne, Pahna
Palaiomylos Balyomilos
Palodeia Palodiya, Palodya
Pano Amiantos Yukarı Amyanto, Yukarı Amiyanto, Yukarı Amyando
Pano Kivides Yukarı Alsandık, Yukarı Civiya, Yukarı Civisil, Yukarı Cevizli
Pano Polemidia Yukarı Binatlı, Yukarı Polemitya, Yukarı Polemidya, Yukarı Polemdiya
Paramali Çayönü, Paramal, Parama, Paramala
Paramytha Baramita, Baramitha, Paramiha, Paramita
Pelendri Belendri, Pelendirye, Pelendiri, Pelendri
Pentakomo Beşevler, Pendakomo, Pendagomo, Ardahan
Pera Pedi Parapedi, Parabek
Pissouri Pissuri, Pisuri
Platania & Karvounas Bladanya & Karbuna, Karvuna
Platanisteia Çamlıca, Bladanisya, Pladanisya, Bladanissa, Pladanista, Pilandanisya, Polatlı
Platres Platres, Yukarı Platres
Potamitissa Bodamidissa, Bodamitissa, Potamitissa
Potamiou Potamyu
Prastio (Avdimou) Çeliktaş
Prastio (Kellaki) Prasyo, Prastiyo
Prodromos Boderomo, Prodoromo, Prodromo
Saittas Sayta
Sanida Sanida
Silikou Silifke, Siliçi, Siligu, Silugu, Siliku, Siliko
Sotira Sotira
Souni–Zanatzia Suni & Zanakya
Spitali İspitali, Spidali
Sykopetra Skopedra
Trachoni Kayakale, Trahon, Trahoni
Trimiklini Termakli
Troodos Mountains Karlıdağ, Trodos
Tserkezoi Çerkez, Çerkez Çiftliği, Çerkez Çiftlik
Vasa Kellakiou Vasa, Vasa Kellaki, Vasa Leymason, Vasa Limasol
Vasa Koilaniou Vasa Evdim, Vasa Ceylan, Vasa Gilan
Vikla Vikla
Vouni Vuni
Ypsonas İpsona
Zoopigi Zopi, Zofça, Zoobiyi, Zoopiyi
Nicosia District Lefkoşa İlçesi (south part)
Agia Eirini Aya İrini, Ayirini, Ayarini
Agia Marina Aymarina
Agioi Iliofotoi Zeytinlik, Alifodez, Alifodes
Agioi Trimithias Aytrimitya, Aytrimityas, Ayos Tirmitye, Ayos Drimitya
Ayios Antonios Ayandon, Aya Andoni
Agios Epifanios Oreinis (Agios Epifanios Klirou) Aya Ebifan, Aya Evani
Agios Epifanios Soleas (Agios Epifanios Linou) Esendağ, Aybifan, Aybıfan, Ayabifan
Agios Sozomenos Arpalık, Aysozemeno, Aysezomeno, Aysozomeno
Agios Theodoros Bozdağ, Aytotro, Aytotoro, Aytottoro, Dillirga Aya Teodoros
Aglandjia Eğlence, Eylence
Athalassa Atalassa
Agrokipia Agrocipye, Agrocibya
Akaki Akaça, Akaca, Akaki
Alampra Alambra, Alamra
Alevga Alevkaya, Alevkayası, Alevga
Alithinou Alişino
Alona Alone, Alona
Anageia Anaya
Analiontas Analyonda, Analiyonda
Anthoupolis Antupolis
Apliki Aplıç
Arediou Aretyu, Aradiyu, Aredyu, Aradyu, Aratyu
Askas Aska
Astromeritis Astromerit, Aspromeliti, Astromerid
Ayios Dhometios (Greek Part) Aydemet, Aya Demet, Metehan
Dali Dali
Idalium İdalyon, Dali
Deneia Denya
Engomi İncirli
Episkopeio Ebiskobiyo, Piskobyo
Ergates Argadez, Arkades, Ergates
Evrychou Evrihu
Farmakas Farmaka
Fikardou Fikardu
Flasou Filsu, Flasu
Fterikoudi İfterikudi
Galata Galata
Gerakies Yeracez, Yeracaz, Yeraces, Yeracer, Yerakies
Geri Geri, Yeri
Gourri Guri, Gurri, Gori, Vorri
Kakopetria Kako Petriye, Kakopetri, Kakopetriya, Gagopedriya, Gagobetriya, Gagobedriya
Kaliana Galyana, Kalyana
Kalo Chorio Kalo Horyo, Kalohorko
Kalopanagiotis Galobanayot, Galabanayot, Kalopanayoti, Kala Banayot, Kalabanayot
Kampi Kambi Farmaka
Kampia Kambiye, Kambiya, Kambya
Kampos Kambo, Gambo
Kannavia Kanavya, Kannavya
Kapedes Kapedez, Kapadis
Kataliontas Gadalyonda, Katalyonda
Katydata Kadya, Kadiya, Katidata, Kadidada
Kato Deftera Aşağı Deftere, Kato Deftera
Kato Koutrafas Aşağı Kurtboğan, Aşağı Kutrafa, Aşağı Kotrafa
Kato Moni Aşağı Moni
Kato Pyrgos Aşağı Pirgo
Klirou Kliru
Kokkinotrimithia Koççinodrimitya
Korakou Koraku, Koragu
Agroladou Agroladu
Kotsiatis Koçyatağı, Koçyalağı, Koççat
Kourdali Kurtali, Kurt Ali, Kurdali, İspilya
Kykkos Monastery Cikko Manastırı
Lagoudera Lagudera, Laguzira
Lakatamia Lakadamya, Lakatamya
Latsia Laçça, Laçya, Latça, Latşa, Latsi, Laççi
Lazanias Lazanya
Linou Linu
Livadia Livatya
Lympia Limbiya
Lythrodontas Litronda, Litrodonda, Litirudondaz
Machairas Monastery Maşera Manastırı, Mahera
Malounta Malunta
Mammari Mamari, Mammari
Mansoura Mansur, Mansura, Mansurağa
Margi Küçükköy, Küçük Köy, Margi, Marki
Mathiatis Matyat, Matiyat, Magyat, Matyaves
Meniko Meniko
Mitsero Mitçero, Mitsero
Mosfileri Mosfili, Mosfileri
Moutoullas Mudulla, Modolla, Mudula
Mylikouri Milikuri
Nicosia Lefkoşa, Lefkoşe
Ayioi Omoloyites Balcıelması, Balcı Elması, Balcı Ayazması, Balcı Ayazma, Ay Omologites
Ayios Andreas Tophane
Ayios Ioannis Aya Yanni, Aya Yani
Ayios Kassianos Kafesli, Aykasyano, Aya Kaşano
Ayios Savvas Aysava
Chrysaliniotissa Krisaliniotisa
Kaimakli Kaymaklı, Büyük Kaymaklı
Nebethane Nöbethane, Növbethane
Omerie Ömeriye, Ömerge, Daniel Paşa, Danyel Paşa
Pallouriotissa Paluriyotisa, Panaya – Ay Konstantin – Eleni
Phaneromeni Yahya Paşa, Yahyapaşa, Arablar Câmii Mahallesi, Faneromeni, Aya Fanoromoni
Tabakhana Tabakhane, Debbağhane
Alexander the Great Street Köfteros Caddesi
Apollo (Haji Christo) Street Hacı Hristo Caddesi
Arsinoes (Kiatip Zade) Street Katip Zade Caddesi
Basil Boulgaroktonos (Mukhtar) Street Muhtar Caddesi
Germanou Patron Street Usta Kadi Caddesi
Palaion Patron Germanos (Hissar) Street Hisar Caddesi
Pericles (Kalkanji) Street Kalkancı Caddesi
Phokionos (Barouti) Street Barut Caddesi
Rigenis (Haji Zannetto) Street Hacı Zannetto Caddesi
Taht-el-kale Tahtakale, Tahta Kala, Taht el Kale
Famagusta Gate (Porta Giuliana) Mağusa Kapısı, Taht-el Kale
Famagusta Street Çarşı Caddesi
Trypiotis Paşa Mahallesi, Baş Mahalle, Tripyodi, Tripiodis
Nikitari Nikitari
Nisou Dizdarköy, Nisu
Oikos İkos, Nikos
Orounta Orunda, Ornuta
Pachyammos Başiyammo
Palaichori Morphou Balahor, Palehor, Palaşori
Palaichori Oreinis Balahor, Palehor, Palaşori
Paliometocho Palyometoho
Pano Deftera Yukarı Deftere, Pano Deftera
Pano Koutrafas Kurtboğan, Yukarı Kurtboğan, Yukarı Kutrafa, Yukarı Kotrafa
Pano Pyrgos Yukarı Pirgo
Pedoulas Pedule, Pedula
Archangelos Michael Church Erhancelo Kilisesi
Pera Chorio Perahoryo
Pera Orinis Pera
Peristerona Güvercinköy, Güvercin, Peristerona, Akaça Peristeronası, Akaça Peristerona
Platanistasa Bladanistas, Bladanistasa
Politiko Politigo, Politko
Polystypos Bolistibo, Polistibo, Polistipos
Potamia Dereliköy, Bodamya, Potamya
Psimolofou İbsomolof, İpsimolofu, İpsimolof
Saranti Sarandi, Saranti
Selladi tou Appi Selçuklu, Sellaintapi
Agion Georgoudi Küçük Selçuklu
Sia Siya
Skouriotissa İskuryotissa, Iskuryotissa, Skuryotisa, Skuryotissa
Spilia İspilya
Strovolos Istrovulo, İstrovulo, Istrovolos, İstrovolos, Strovulos
Tamassos Tamasus
Temvria Tembriye, Tembriya
Tillyria Dillirga, Dilirga, Dillirya, Tillirya
Tsakistra Çakistra
Tseri Çeri, Atesri
Vroisha (Frodisia) Yağmuralan, Vroyşa, Vroişa
Vyzakia Vizakya, Vizaca
Xyliatos Hiliyatos, Sliyatoz, İksilyatos
Paphos District Baf İlçesi
Acheleia Açelya, Aşelya, Akeli
Agia Marinouda Ayarinuda, Aya Marinuda
Agia Varvara Engindere, Ayvarvara, Aya Varvara, Kayalık
Agios Dimitrianos Aya Dimitriyano, Ayamteriyano
Agios Georgios Ayyorgi, Ay Yorgi, Aya Yorgi, Ayayorgi, Baf Ayorgisi
Agios Ioannis Aydın, Aydınköy, Aygın, Ayanni, Ayyani, Ayyanni, Aya Yani, Çamlı Manastır
Agios Isidoros Demirci, Aya Sidera, Aya Sidiro, Aya Sidro, Ay Sederos, Aysideras, Aysideros
Agios Neophytos Monastery Ayneofidos Manastırı
Agios Nikolaos Esentepe, Aynikola, Aya Nikola, Ayanikola
Akamas Peninsula Akama Yarımadası, Agama
Akoursos Akarsu, Akurço, Akurso
Amargeti Amarkent, Amarkez, Amarged, Amargerd, Amarget, Amargit, Amarkit, Gelgit
Anadiou Görmeli, Anadyu
Anarita Anarite, Anarida, Anarita
Androlykou Gündoğdu, Androliko, Antroligo, Androliku, Antroliku, Androniko
Archimandrita Arçimandrita, Argimandrida, Arhimandrita, Arhimandrida, Arkimandrida, Arşimandrida, Arcimandirva, Arçimandirye
Arminou Ermino, Arminu
Armou Armu, Armuta, Armo, Amro
Asprogia Aktepe, Asporye, Asproya
Axylou Aksulu, Aksu, Akselu, Aksilu, Aksilo, Aksiluro, Akaslu, Aksyalu, Selim
Ayia Marina Chrysochous Aya Marina Hırsofu, Amarin
Ayia Marina Kelokedharon Aymarina, Aya Marina Kelokedaron, Aya Marina
Cape Arnauti Arnavut Burnu
Cape Drepanum Drepano Burnu, Dırepanum Burnu
Cape Geranissos Yeraniso Burnu, Yeranisos Burnu
Cape Lara Lara Burnu
Cape Pomos Pomo Burnu, Pomos Burnu
Chloraka Hiloraka
Choletria Koletriya
Choli Holi
Choulou Hulu
Chrysochous Bay Hacısofu Körfezi, Hırsofu Körfezi
Chrysochou Altıncık, Hacısofu, Hırsofu, Hırsofi, Hirsofu, Hırsofo, Hrisofi
Chrysoroyiatissa Monastery Hrisoroyadissa Manastırı
Dhrousha Diruşe, Druşa, Truşa
Drymou Trimu
Eledio Eledyu, Eledgü, Aliyot, Alâettin
Empa Emba, Enba
Episkopi Piskobu
Evretou Dereboyu, Evreti, Evratu, Evretu, Evreçe, Avrece, İvrecca
Faleia Gökçebel, Falya
Fasli Fesli, Faslı
Fasoula, Paphos Bağrıkara, Fasula
Foinikas Finike, Finika, Yenigazi
Fyti Fidi
Galataria Yoğurtçular, Galatariye, Galatarka, Galatarya
Geroskipou Yeroşibu, Yeroşibo, Yerosibo, Yerokipo
Gialia Yayla, Yalya
Giolou Yolu, Yulu
Goudi Gudi
Inia İnya
Istinjon (Kios) Tabanlı, İstinco, İstingo
Appidhaki tou İstinjo Appiyaca Çiftliği
Kathikas Kadiga, Kahika
Kannaviou Kannavyu
Karamoullides Kervanyolu, Karamulla, Karamolla, Karamulles, Karamulyez, Karamullides
Kato Akourdhalia Aşağı Kardali, Aşağı Kordaliye, Aşağı Akurdalya
Kato Arodes Aşağı Kalkanlı, Aşağı Arodez, Aşağı Arode, Aşağı Arudez
Kedares Çığır, Cidares, Kedare, Ketares, Kedhares
Kelokedara Kelokedara, Celocedra, Celocedere, Celocera
Kidasi Ceyhan, Cidas, Ciyas, Baf Cidas
Kilinia Kilinya, Kilinye
Kinousa Kinusa
Kissonerga Cissonerga
Koili Kili
Koloni Yolüstü, Koloni
Konia Konya
Kouklia Sakarya, Kukla, Kukla Celocera, Eski Baf
Kourtaka Kurtağa, Kurdaka, Kurtaka
Kritou Marottou Girit Marot, Girit Marut, Girit Marota, Karito Maritu
Kritou Terra Girittera, Girit Tera, Giritutera, Kirse Tera
Lapithiou Bozalan, Labikyu, Lapityu
Latchi Laçi, Lakki
Lemona Lemona
Lempa Çıralı, Çıralıköy, Lemba, Lenba
Lasa Lasa
Loukrounou Olukönü, Lukruni, Lukrunu, Lukrono
Lysos Liso
Makounta Yakacık, Magunda, Makunda, Makunde, Makonde
Mamonia Mamonya
Mamountali Soğucak, Mamundali, Mahmutali, Mamunlu
Mandria Yeşilova, Mandirya, Mandirga
Marathounta Maratunde, Marutanya
Maronas Uluçam, Marone, Marona
Meladeia Malatya, Melatya, Maltya
Melamiou Melemyu
Melandra Beşiktepe, Beşiktepeli, Melandra, Melendre
Mesa Chorio İçköy
Mesana Mesane
Milia Milya
Miliou Melyu, Milyu
Moro Nero Küçük Su, Küçüksu, Moronero
Mousere Muzere, Musori
Mirmikofou Mirminko, Mirimikop, Mirmiko
Nata Nate
Nea Dimmata Dimmat, Dimmada
Neo Chorio Yeniköy, Neyohoryo, Neohoryo
Nikokleia Nikokli, Nikokliya
Panagia Banaya, Panaya, Balogya
Pano Akourdaleia Yukarı Kardali, Yukarı Kordaliye, Yukarı Akurdalya
Pano Arodes Yukarı Kalkanlı, Yukarı Arodez, Yukarı Arode, Yukarı Arudez
Paphos Baf, Gazi Baf, Kasaba
Kato Paphos Dip Baf, Yeni Baf, Aşağı Baf
Moutallos Mutallo, Mutalos
Pano Paphos (Ktima) Kasaba, Yukarı Baf
Pegeia Peya, Peye
Pelathousa Karaağaç, Peletusa, Pelatusa, Platusa, Platosa
Pentalia Pendalya
Peristerona Peristerona
Petra Tou Romiou Rumtaşı, Afrodit Kayası, Gavurtaşı, Gavur Taşı
Philousa Kelokedharon Filusa Kelokedara
Philousa Khrysokhous Filusa Hırsofu
Pitargou Akkargı, Pidarku, Pitargu
Polis (Polis Chrysochous) Poli
Limni Limni
Mavroli Karaali İskelesi
Pomos Pomo, Pomos
Praitori Poritori, Protori, Pretori
Prastio Yuvalı, Prastyo, Prasyo
Prodromi Karşıyaka, Prodromi
Psathi İşati, Psati
Roudia Bridge Rudiya Köprüsü
Salamiou Salamyu
Sarama Kuşluca, Sareme, Sarama
Simou Simo
Skoulli Askolli, Skuli
Souskiou Susuz, Susuzköy
Statos–Agios Fotios Istato, İstato & Ayfodiyo, Aya Fodi
Stavrokonnou Aydoğan, İstavrokono, İstavrogonno, İstavrugonlu, Stavrogonno, Stavrokkonno, Stavrokonno, Kayalık
Steni İsteni, Steni
Stroumpi İstrumbi, Ustrumbi, Usturunbi
Tala Dala, Dale, Tala
Terra Çakırlar, Tere, Tera
Thrinia Tirine, Drinya, Trinya
Timi Ovalık, Dimi, Timi
Tremithousa Tremituse, Tremetusa, Tremetuşa
Trimithousa Uzunmeşe, Trimitusa
Tsada Çada, Çade
Vretsia Dağaşan, Vretça, Vreçça, Vreça, Viratça, Evreçe
Zacharia Tatlıca, Zaharka, Zaharga
Cedar Valley Sedir Vadisi
Kouris River Kuris Deresi, Tabakhane
Paphos Forest Baf Ormanı
Pedieos River Kanlıdere, Kanlı Dere

Czech Republic
Bohemia Bohemya, Buyama, Bühamiya
Brno Brün, Brünn, Beren
Czech Republic Çek Cumhuriyeti, Çekya, Çehya, Çehistan
Hodonín Göding
Jablonec nad Nisou Gablonca, Gablonce
Karlovy Vary Karlova, Karlovari
Morava (river) Murava
Moravia Moravya
Olomouc Almüç, Olmütz
Opava Atropav
Ostrava Ostrava
Pardubice Pardubiçe
Plzeň Pilzen, Pilsen
Prague Prag, Braga, Frag, İfrak, Brak, Prak, Perak, Yüz Kuleli
Silesia Silezya
Teplice Teplice, Tepriç
Ústí nad Labem Usti

Denmark
Copenhagen Kopenhag

Egypt
Alexandria İskenderiye
Arish Ariş, Elarış
Aswan Asvan
Asyut Asyut
Belbeis Bilbeys
Benha Benha
Cairo Kahire
Al-Gawhara Palace Cevhere Sarayı
Bab Zuweila Bab el Zuveyla, Bab'ül Zuveyla
Boulaq Bulak
Khan el-Khalili Han Halil
Mokattam El Mukattam Dağı
Mosque of Muhammad Ali Kavalalı Mehmet Ali Paşa Camii
Ridaniya Ridaniye
Zamalek Üzümlük
Clysma Kulzüm
Damanhur Demenhur
Damietta Dimyat
El-Mahalla El-Kubra Mahalletü'l Kebir, Kübra
Faiyum Feyyum
Girga Circe
Giza Gize, Cize
Ismaïlia İsmailiye
Katia Katya
Luxor El-Uksur, Luksor
Mansoura Mansure
Mersa Matruh Mirsa Berek, Baretun, El Baretun
Minya Minye
Monufia Menufiye
Nekhel Kal'a-i Nahl, Nahl
Pelusium Tine, Sena, Farama
Port Said Bür Said
Qalyub Kalyub, Kalubiye
Qalyubiyya Kalubiye
Qasr Ibrim İbrim
Qusayr Kusayr, Kuseyr
Rosetta Raşit, Reşit, Reşid
Sallum Selum, Sellum, Sollum
Sharm el-Sheikh Şarm el Şeyh
Shibin Al Kawm Şibinü'l Kum
Shubra Şubra
Sohag Sevhac
Suez Süveyş
Tanta Tanta
Zagazig Zekazik

Eritrea
Arkiko Hergigo
Asmara Asmara
Dahlak Archipelago Dehlek Takımadaları, Dahlak
Debarwa Debarva
Massawa Musavva, Masavva, Massu, Masu, Masava

Ethiopia
Abyssinia Habeşistan, Abisinimye
Addis Ababa Addis Ababa, Adis Ababa, Addis Abeba
Mekelle Mekele
Negash Necaşi
Shashamane Şeşmane, Şaşmane
Weldiya Velidiye

Europe
Adriatic Sea Adriyatik Denizi, Venedik Körfezi, Venedik Halici
Danube Tuna
Rhine Ren

Finland
Janakkala Yanakkale

France
Alsace-Lorraine Alsas-Loren
Aumale Elbe-Marlu
Auvergne Uranya
Avignon Abinyun, Navenyan, Aben Yunus, Beni Yunus
Bayonne Beyun
Bastia Pestiye, Peştiye
Bonifacio Bonofasa
Bordeaux Bordo, Bürzil
Bourganeuf Burgono Kalesi
Cannes Kan, Kanas
Corsica Korsika, Korsuka, Kurnus, Korsuga
Dauphiné Delfinato
Domalain Domalan
Dunkirk Dunkarkız, Donkarkız
Fraxinet Ferahşe, Ferahşenit
Grenoble Granoboro
Îles d'Hyères Üçadalar, İzledare, Lariş Adaları, Dara Adaları
La Marche Mariyaka
Limons Limonş
Limousin Limuzin, Leyimuzin
Malplaquet Mal-Plak
Marseille Marsilya, Marsal, Marçilya, Marşilya
Montpellier Monpolorye
Narbonne Erbune, Arbüne, Arbûne
Nice Nis, Nitse, Nise
Poitiers Puvatya, Puvatiye, Puvatye
Ramatuelle Rahmetullah
Rhone Ron Nehri
Roquefort-sur-Soulzon Rokfor
Rougelas Rugeleş
Savoie Salon, Savoya
Sèvres Sevr
Strasbourg Strazburg
Toulon Tulon, Tolon
Toulouse Tulus, Tuluşe
Tours Tur, Balatüşşüheda
Trianon Triyanon
Versailles Versay, Varsalye

Georgia
Adjara Acaristan, Acarya, Eceristan, Egeristan
Batumi Batum
Chakvi Çakva
Gonio Gönye, Apsaros, Günye, Güney, Künye, Güniye, Gonyo
Keda Keda
Khelvachauri Helvacı, Helvaçavur
Khulo Hula, Hula Kale, Kula Kale
Kobuleti Çürüksu, Kabulet, Kapulet, Kobulet
Makhinjauri Mahincavur
Ochkhamuri Oçhamur
Sarpi Sarp
Shuakhevi Şuahev, Orta Vadi
Guria Güril, Gürel, Gürye, Gorya
Ozurgeti Oçerki, Azerkit
Shekvetili Şevketil, Şevket-İl, Şefketil, Şekvetil
Imereti Açıkbaş
Chiatura Çiyatura
Khoni Hon
Kintrishi Kintriş
Kutaisi Kutas, Kutayıs, Kütayis, Kortata
Sachkhere Saçere
Sagarejo Karaçöp
Zestaponi Zestapon
Kakheti Kahit, Kahet, Kaheti
Gurjaani Gürcühanı
Iormughanlo Muğanlı
Lagodekhi Kaval
Signagi Sığınak
Telavi Telav
Kvemo Kartli Borçalı, Borçalistan
Bolnisi Çürük Kemerli, Karatepe, Bolus, Bolulus
Dmanisi Başkeçid, Başgeçit
Gardabani Karatepe, Karayazı
Marneuli Sarvan
Rustavi Bostandere, Bostanşehir
Tetritsqaro Ağbulak, Akbulak
Tsalka Parmaksız, Zelka, Zalha, Çalka
Meskheti Mesketya, Misketya
Abastumani Abastümen, Abastuman, Abastuban
Adigeni Adıgün, Adigön, Adıgen
Akhalkalaki Ahilkelek, Ahılkelek, Ahırkelek, Ahikelek, Ağkale, Ahal Kelek (Ak Kale)
Akhaltsikhe Ahıska, Aksıka
Aspindza Espince, Esmince, Aspinza, Aspinze, Asminza
Atskuri Azgur
Benara Beynara
Borjomi Borcum, Borcom
Chacharaki Çeçerek, Çeçarak, Cecerek
Javakheti Range Karaağaç Sıradağları
Khanchali Lake Kancalı Gölü
Khertvisi Hırtız, Hertvis
Ninotsminda Altunkale, Hocabey, Altun Kala
Oshora Osıkha, Oşe
Paravani Lake Pervane Gölü
Tmogvi Tümek
Tsakhani Sağan, Sahan
Ude Ude
Vale Vale
Mount Kazbek Kazman Dağı
Mtskheta-Mtianeti Misheta-Mtiyaneti
Mtskheta Misheta, Miçheta
Stepantsminda Kazbek
Racha-Lechkhumi and Kvemo Svaneti Raça – Leçhumi ve Aşağı Suvanya
Lechkhumi Leçhumi, Lechumi
Racha Raça, Raca
Svaneti Suvanya, Suvanetya
Kvemo Svaneti Aşağı Suvanya
Lentekhi Lentehi
Samegrelo-Zemo Svaneti Megrelya – Yukarı Suvanya
Mingrelia Megrelya, Mingrelya, Migrelya, Mengrelya, Megrelistan, Mingirelya, Mekrilistan, Mikrilistan, Dadyan
Anaklia Anakara, Anakra
Poti Poti, Faş, Faşe
Redoubt Kali Redut Kale, Redutkale, Kulevi
Zugdidi Zükdit, Zekdide
Svaneti Suvanya, Suvanetya
Zemo Svaneti Yukarı Suvanya
Mestia Mestiya
Shida Kartli İç Kartli, İç Gürcistan, Karduvel
Gori Göri, Sefiabad
Kareli Kara El
Kaspi Hazaryurdu
Khashuri Beytahtı
Tbilisi Tiflis
Narikala Narinkale

Abkhazia
Gali Gal
Gudauta Gudait, Guda Uta
Kodori Valley Kodor Vadisi*
Lykhny Soğuksu, Lihni, Lıhnı
New Athos Yeni Afon, Anakopya, Absara
Anacopia Fortress Anakopya Kalesi
Ochamchire Çamçıra, Çamşıra, Şimşir, Oçamçira, Oçamçıra, Oçemçira
Pitsunda Bucunda, Besonta, Pezonda
Samurzakano Semirzağan
Sukhumi Sohumkale, Sahum, Suhumkale, Sohum, Sukumkale
Tamishi Tamış

South Ossetia
Tskhinvali Şinval

Germany

Greece

Hungary
Adony Cankurtaran Palankası, Korkmaz Kale
Babócsa Bobofça, Babofça, Baboça, Babuça, Bobaça, Bobokça, Papoçe
Baja Baya
Balassagyarmat Germat
Balaton Lake Balaton Gölü, Balatin, Balatın
Balatonendréd Endrik
Balmazújváros Yapışmaz
Bátaszék Bataşek, Bat Ösek, Batasek
Békés Bekeş
Békéscsaba Bekeş-Çaba, Çaba
Belső-Szolnok Beleşö, Belşö
Berzence Berzençe, Berzenç, Berzence, Berzense
Bisse Bise
Buda Budin (historical), Budun, Buda, Budim
Budapest Budapeşte
Bécsi kapu Beç Kapusi (Viyana Kapısı)
Buda Castle Kızılsaray, Kızılhisar
Church of Mary Magdalene, Budapest Mecdelli Meryem Kilisesi, Fethiye Cami
Gellért Hill Gürz Elyas Bayırı, Gürz İlyas Bayırı, Gürzilyas Baba Dağı
Margaret Island Kızadası
Matthias Church Matyas Kilisesi, Süleyman Han Cami, Eski Cami, Büyük Cami, Ulu Cami
Pest Peşte
Rózsadomb Gültepe
Svábhegy Muhabbet Tepe
Bugac Boğaç
Buják Buyak, Boyak
Crișul Alb Ak Köröş
Csákánydoroszló Çakan, Çakani
Csákvár Çakvar
Császár Çasar-ı Nemse
Csepel Island Koyun Adası, Kovun Adası, Kuvin Adası, Cezire-i Kovin
Cserép Çerep
Csesznek Çaşnik
Csobánc Çobaniçe, Çobaniçse
Csongrád Çongrad
Csővár Çövar
Csurgó Çurgo
Debrecen Debrecen, Debreçin, Debreçen, Debrecin, Döbröçin, Dobreçin
Devecser Deveçer
Döbrököz Döbrekös
Dombóvár Donbo, Donbol, Dombo
Drégely Castle Diregel Kalesi, Deregel, Böğürdelen, Büğürdelen
Drégelypalánk Diregel, Deregel, Yeni Palanka
Dunaföldvár Födvar, Fötvar, Fedvar, Föltvar
Dunakiliti Tunakilidi
Dunaszekcső Sekçöy, Sekçuy, Sekçay, Seçuy, Seçöy
Dunaújváros Pentili, Penteli
Eger Eğri, Eğre
Eger Mosque Kethüda Camii
Egervár Eğrivar, Egirvar, Egervar, Egrevar, Ekervar
Ercsi Erçin
Érd Hamzabey Palankası, Erdi
Érd Mosque Hamza Bey Camii
Esztergom Estergon, Usturgon, Üstürgon, Ostorgon, Estorgon
Szenttamás Tepedelen
Felsőegerszeg Eğrisek, Eğirsek, Egerseg, Egirseg 
Felsőszentmárton Vaşkasenmartin
Futak Futok
Gölle Göle
Gönyű Gönyü
Gyarmat Garmat, Kermat, Kiyermot, Kârmut
Gyöngyös Göngöş
Győr Yanıkkale, Yanık, Kör
Gyula Göle, Güle, Gule, Küle, Külvar, Kulvar
Hatvan Hatvan, Hetvan
Hajdúság Hayduşak
Harsány İrşan
Heves Heveş, Heves
Hollókő Holloka, Hollok
Hont Hond, Hont
Ipeľ River İpel Irmağı
Ipolydamásd Derbend
Jánoshalma Yankofça
Jászberény Canfeda, Yazberin, Yaşberin
Jéke Çekevar
Kalocsa Kalaça
Kálló Kalo, Halil
Kápolna Kapona
Kaposvár Kapoşvar, Kopoşvar
Karád Karat, Karad
Karašica Kıraşıça
Karcag Karsak
Kartal Kartal
Kecskemét Keçkemet, Keçkemed
Kiskunság Küçük Kumanya, Küçük Kumanistan, Küçük Kıpçakya
Kisvárda Kışvarad
Komárom Komran, Komaran, Kumran, Komaron, Komoron
Kölked Külküt
Körmend Kemendvar, Keminvar, Kementvar, Kemenvar, Kermen
Körös River Keres, Kiriş, Köröş
Kőröshegy Köröş
Kőszeg Kösek, Güns
Lak Lake
Madaras Madaraş
Marcali Mersel, Marçal
Mecseknádasd Nadaç, Nadaş, Nadaj, Nedaj
Mezőkeresztes Haçova
Miskolc Miskolfçe, Miskolca, Mişkofça
Mohács Mohaç, Mıhaç, Mihaç
Nagyecsed Eçetvar, Açetvar
Nagyhalász Halmas, Halmaş
Nagyharsány Harşan
Nagykanizsa Kanije, Kanice, Kanca
Nagykunság Büyük Kumanya, Büyük Kumanistan, Büyük Kıpçakya
Nagynyárád Nazinyart
Nagyoroszi Böğürdelen, Büğürdelen
Nagyút, Heves Nakot
Nagyvázsony Vacon, Vajon
Nemeske Nemeşka, Gırıjgal
Nógrád Novigrad, Nograd, Nevigrat, Novigrat
Obuda Eski Budin, Budin-i Atik
Ózd Oğuz, Uz
Ozora Ozor, Ozora
Paks Pakşa, Pahşa, Bahşa, Bahsa
Palánkpuszta, Szekszárd Yeni Palanka, Palanka-i Cedid
Pannonhalma Semartin, Samartin, Senmartin
Pápa Papa
Pécs Peçuy, Peçevi, Beşkilise, Beşe, Paçuy, Peçoy
Mosque of Pasha Jakováli Hasszán Yakovalı Hasan Paşa Camii
Mosque of Pasha Qasim Gazi Kasım Paşa Camii
Pécsvárad Peçvarad
Pilisvörösvár Kızılhisar, Kızılhisar Palankası
Pocsaj Poçay
Polgár Bolgar
Pölöske Beleşke, Yeleşke, Peleşke
Rába Rabi Nehri, Raba, Rabe, Aksu
Rábahídvég Hidveg
Ráckeve Cezire-i Kovin, Kiskeve, Küçük Kovin
Salgótarján Şalgo
Salgó Castle Şalgo Kalesi
Sárospatak Şarbatak
Sárvár Şarvar
Sárvíz Şarviz, Şaviz
Segesd Segeş
Sellye Şelin, Şilye
Siklós Şikloş, Şaklofça, Sikloş, Şıkloş
Simontornya Şimontorna, Şimontorina, Şementorna, Samatorna, Şimetorna, Şimotorne
Siófok Foka
Sirok Şiroka
Somlóvásárhely Şomlo
Somogytúr Türdi, Tardes
Somoskőújfalu Somoşka, Şomoşka, Somoşkö
Sopron Sobran, Sopron, Şubruna, Şopron
Sümeg Şimek
Szabadbattyán Bak'an
Szabolcs Saboç
Szakcs Sakç
Szanda Sonda, Sanda
Szarvas Sarvaş
Szarvaskő Sarvaşka
Szászvár Sas, Saz
Szava Sava
Szecseny Seçen, Seçan, Siçan, Siçen
Szeged Segedin, İskit
Székesfehérvár İstolni Belgrad, Üstolni Belgrad, Ustolni Belgrad, Üstuni Belgrad, Akkala, Taht Akkale, Yesenise, İstolni
Szekszárd Seksar, Sansar, Sekçay
Szendrő Semendire, Semendin
Szentendre Sentendire
Szentgotthárd San Gotar, Sen Çotar, San Çotar, Sankoncar, Sengotar
Szentkirály Senkiral
Szentlőrinc Senlörinç
Szigetvar Zigetvar (Ada Kalesi), Sigetvar, Segitvar
Szigliget Zigliget
Szolnok Sonluk, Sonlok, Solnak, Belşusonluk, Somlok, Somunluk, Beşosonlok, Solnok
Szombathely Sünbüthel
Szőny Sön
Tabán Tabakhane Mahallesi
Tamási Tomaşin
Tata Tata
Tihany Tihon
Tisza Tisa, Tise, Nise
Tokaj Tokay, Tokayvar
Tolna Tolna, Toğna, Tolna Palangası
Tömörkény Tömörkin
Törökkoppány Kopan
Törökszentmiklós Senmikloş
Vác Vaç
Vál Val
Várpalota Palota, Polata
Vásárosnamény Namin
Vasvár Vasvar, Vaşvar
Veszprém Besprim, Pesprim, Bespirim, Bespirem, Pespirim, Vesprim, Vespirim, Bersperem, Persperem
Visegrád Vişegrad, Vişgrad
Vitany Vitan
Zalaegerszeg Egersek, Ersekiyvar, Ersekuyvar
Zalakomár Komer
Zsámbék Canbek

India
Agra Agra
Chennai Madras, Çennay
Delhi Delhi, Şahcihanabad, Dilli
Diu Dev, Bender-i Dev
Ghoghla Gogala, Bender-i Türk
Goa Güvve
Hyderabad Haydarabat
Kochi Koçin
Kolkata Kalküta, Kaliküt, Kolkata
Kozhikode Kalikut
Mumbai Bombay, Mumbay
Pondicherry Poduke, Pondiçeri
Sikkim Sikkim, Sıkkım
Surat Surat
Aurangabad Evrengabad
Vishakapatnam Vizag, Vişakapatnem
Murud-Janjira Habeş-i Hindistan, Hebsan
Ernakulam Ernak
Satara Satare
Wardha Verda
Coimbatore Hambat
Thiruvanthapuram Tırivantapura
Faridabad Ferıdabat
Vellore Vellor
Nellore Nellor
Mumbra Küçük Mumbay, Küçük Bombay
Nizamabad Nizamabad

Indonesia
Aceh Açe, Aceh
Banda Aceh Bender Açe
Jakarta Cakarta

Iran
Abadan Abadan
Aghajari Ağaçeri, Ağaçarı
Ahvaz Ahvaz
Alamut Alamut
Amol Amul
Arak Erak, Karaç, Sultan Abad
Ardabil Erdebil
Avajiq Avacık, Ovacık
Bazargan Bezirgan, Bazergan
Birjand Bircend
Bonab Bunab, Binev
Bojnord Bucnurt, Bocnurt, Bucnurd
Bukan Bukan
Bushehr Buşir, Buşehir, Buşehr
Chaldoran Çaldıran, Çaldıran Ovası
Damghan Damgan, Damğan
Ecbatana Hemedan, Ekbatan, Akbatan
Esfahan İsfahan
Firuzabad Firuzabad
Gol Anbar Gül Anbar, Gül Ambar, Gülembe
Gonbad-e Kavus Günbed-i Kavus, Günbedkavus, Cürcen, Deşt-i Gürgen, Kümmet
Gorgan Gürgen, Gürgan, Gürcan, Cürcen, Cürcan, Esterabad
Hamadan Hemedan, Ekbatan, Akbatan
Hashtrud Heştrud
Hawraman Horaman, Evreman, Hevreman, Havraman
Hormuz Island Hürmüz Adası, Dermüz
Karahrud Kerehrud, Kara Rud
Kashan Kaşan, Kaçan
Kerman Kirman, Kerman
Kermanshah Kirmanşah
Khoramabad Hürremabad
Khorasan Horasan
Khoy Hoy
Kordan Kürdan, Kerden, Karden, Kurdan
Lake Urmia Urmiye Gölü, Urumiye Gölü
Larak Island Larak
Mahabad Mahabad, Soğukbulak 
Maku Maku, Makü
Maragheh 
Mashhad Meşhed
Meshk-e Anbar Meşk-i Anbar, İşgenber
Miandoab Koşaçay, Miyanduab
Naqadeh Sulduz
Nahavand Nihavend, Nehavend
Naqsh-e Rustam Nakş-ı Rüstem
Nishapur Nişabur, Nişapur, Neyşabur
Oshnaviyeh Uşnu, Üşnü, Üşneviye, Işıklı
Parsabad Parsabad, Koçkent, Farsabad
Persepolis 
Persian Gulf Basra Körfezi, İran Körfezi, Kenger Körfezi, Pers Körfezi, Bahr-i Paris,  Bahr-i Fars
Piranshahr Piranşehr, Hane
Qara Kelissa Kara Kilise
Qareh Zia' od Din Kara Ziyaeddin
Qasr-e Shirin Kasr-ı Şirin, Kasrışirin
Qatur Katur, Kotur, Kutur
Qazvin Kazvin, Gazvîn
Qeshm Keşim, Keşm
Qom Kum
Rasht Reşt
Ray Rey
Sabzevar Sebzevar, Beyhak, Bayhak
Salmas Salmas, Selamas, Dilman, Şapur
Sanandaj Senendec, Sine, Sinne
Saqiz Sakız
Sarab Serap, Serab
Sardasht Serdeşt, Zerdüşt, Sarıtaş
Sarpol-e Zahab Serpol Zehab, Sarıpul, Zuhab
Sarakhs Serhas, Serahs
Serow Sero, Siro
Shahindej Şahinkale
Shiraz Şiraz
Showt Şot, Şahabad
Siah Cheshmeh Siyah Çeşme, Kara Eyni
Sonqor Sungur
Sumay-ye Beradust Sumay, Somay
Susa Susa, Şuşan, Şuş, Şuşa
Tabas Tebes
Tabriz Tebriz
Takab Tikantepe, Dikentepe
Tehran Tahran, Taht-ı Rey
Torbat-e Heydarieh Türbet Haydariye, Türbet İshak Han
Torkamanchay Türkmençay
Tus Tus
Urmia Urmiye, Urumiye, Rumiye
Yazd Yezit, Yezd
Zanjan Zencan, Zincan

Iraq
Anbar Governorate Anbar İli
Anah District Ane İlçesi
Anah Ane
Fallujah District Felluce İlçesi
Fallujah Felluce
Haditha District Hadise İlçesi
Haditha Hadise
Hīt District Hit İlçesi
Hīt Hit
Kabisa Kübeyse
Ramadi District Ramadi İlçesi
Ramadi Ramadi, Ramadiye
Babil Governorate Babil İli
Hilla District Hille İlçesi
Babylon Babil, Sarkel
Hillah Hille, Hilla, El Hille, Hılle
Musayab District Müseyyip İlçesi
Musayyib Müseyyip
Baghdad Governorate Bağdat İli
Baghdad Bağdat
Adhamiyah District Azamiye İlçesi
Wazireya Veziriye
Kadhimiya District Kazımiye İlçesi
Kadhimiya Kazımiye
Karrada District Kerrade (Karadağ) İlçesi
Mansour District Mansur İlçesi
Amiriyah Amiriye, Emiriye
Ghazaliya Gazeliye
Yarmouk Yermük
Rashid District Raşit, Reşit
Rusafa District Rusafe
Zafraniya District Safraniye İlçesi
Zafraniya Safraniye
Abu Ghraib District Ebu Garip İlçesi
Abu Ghraib Ebu Garip, Ebu Hureybe
Mada'in District Madein İlçesi
Ctesiphon Tizfun, Tizpon, Medayin, Medin, Kutaysifun, Tisfun, Taysafün
Mada'in Madein, Maden
Salman Pak Selman-ı Pak, Selmanıpak
Mahmudiya District Mahmudiye İlçesi
Mahmoudiyah Mahmudiye
Yusufiyah Yusufiye
Basra Governorate Basra İli
Basra Basra
Faw District Fao İlçesi
Faw Fao, El Fao, Fav
Qurnah District Kurna İlçesi
Qurnah Kurna
Shatt al-Arab Şattülarap, Şattülarab
Dhi Qar Governorate Zi Kar (Müntefik) İli
Nasiriyah District Nasıriye İlçesi
Nasiriyah Nasıriye
Shatrah District Şatra İlçesi
Shatrah Şatra
Diyala Governorate Diyala (Diyale, Diyali) İli
Balad Ruz District Beledruz İlçesi
Balad Ruz Beledruz, Baladruz
Mandali Mendeli, Mendilli, Mendelcin
Qazzaniya Kazaniye
Tursaq Tursak
Baqubah District Bakuba İlçesi
Baqubah Bakuba, Bakube, Ukuba
Khalis District Halis İlçesi
Ashraf City Eşref Kasabası
Delli Abbas Deli Abbas
Khalis Halis, El Halis
Mansouryah Mansuriye
Khanaqin District Hanekin İlçesi
Jabbara Cebbara
Jalawla Karahan, Karağan, Celevle, Celavla, Gelevle, Gelevla
Khanaqin Hanekin, Hanakin, Hanakın, Hankin, Hanıkayn
Parwiz Khan Pervezhan, Pervizhan
Sadiyah Kızıl Rabat, Kızılrabat, Kızıl Rıbat, Kızılrıbat, Kızıl Ribât, Kızılrubat, Kızlarabad, Kızlarbad, Kızlarbat, Kızrabat, Kızılarbat, Sadiye
Kifri District Kifri İlçesi
Kifri Kifri, Kıfri, Kifiri, Selâhiye, Salahiye, Eski Kifri
Qarah Tabbah Karatepe
Miqdadiyah District Şehriban İlçesi
Miqdadiyah Şehriban, Şahraban, Şehreban, Şaraban, Şahbaran, Mikdadiye 
Karbala Governorate Kerbela İli
Hindiya District Hindiye İlçesi
Hindiya Hindiye
Karbala Kerbela
Kirkuk Governorate Kerkük İli
Daquq District Tavuk İlçesi
Daquq Tavuk, Tauk, Dakuk
Dibis District Dıbıs İlçesi
Altun Kupri Altınköprü, Altunköprü
Daraman al Kubra Büyük Derman, Büyük Daraman
Dibis Dıbıs, Dubiz, Dibıs, Dibis
Sargaran Sergeran
Hawija District Havice İlçesi
Abbasi Abbas, Abbasi
Hawija Havice
Rashad El-Reşat, Reşad
Riyadh Riyaz, Riyad
Zab El Zap
Kirkuk District Kerkük İlçesi
Baba Gurgur Baba Gürgür
Bashir Beşir, Beşir Kasabası
Belawa Belava 
Cerdagli Çardağlı, Çardaklı, Çerdağlı
Chakhmakha Çakmak
Chaman Buyuk Büyükçimen, Büyük Çimen
Gurga Chal Karakoçal
Kirkuk Kerkük
Kirkuk Citadel Kerkük Kalesi
Qaysareyah of Kirkuk Kayseriye Çarşısı, Kayseri Çarşısı
Qishla of Kirkuk Kerkük Kışlası, Kışla
Kumbetler Kümbetler, Gümbetler
Laylan Kara Hasan, Karahasan, Leylan
Multaqa Mülteka
Qara Hanjir Kara İncir, Kara Hançer
Sabunchi Sabuncu
Saqizli Sakızlı
Shuwan Şivan, Şıvan
Tar Kalan Türkalan, Türkelan, Tirkalan, Terkelan
Taza Khurmatu Tazehurmatu, Taze Hurma, Tazehurma
Yayci Yaycı
Maysan Governorate Meysan İli
Amara District Emare İlçesi
Amarah Emare, İmara, Amara, Ammâre
Qal'at Saleh District Kalat Salih ilçesi
Uzair Üzeyr, Üzeyir
Muthanna Governorate Müsenne İli
Rumaitha District Rümeyse İlçesi
Rumaitha Rümeyse, Rümahiye, Rumahiyye
Samawah District Semave İlçesi
Samawah Semave
Najaf Governorate Necef İli
Najaf District Necef İlçesi
Najaf Necef, Banikya, Banukya
Kufa District Küfe İlçesi
Kufa Küfe, Kufe, Kufa
Nineveh Governorate Ninova (Musul) İli
Aqrah District Akra İlçesi
Aqrah Akra, Akbeden
Hamdaniya District Hamdaniye (Bağdede) İlçesi
Aski Kalak Eski Kelek
Bakhdida Karakuş, Hamdaniye, Bağdede
Balawat Balavat
Bashiqa Başika, Beşika
Kalak Kelek
Karemlash Keremleş, Keremliş, Karemleş
Nimrud Nimrut
Hatra District Hıdırlar İlçesi
Hatra Hıdırlar, Hazar
Al-Hadar Hıdırlar, Hazar
Makhmur District Mahmur İlçesi
Dibagah Dibege
Gwer Güver
Makhmur Mahmur
Mosul District Musul İlçesi
Arbajiyah Arpacı, Arpaçay
Gagjali Gökçeli
Jawan Civan, Cıvan
Mosul Musul
Qasab Kasap
Qayyarah Kayyare
Shekhan District Şeyhan İlçesi
Ain Sifni Aynsüfni, Ayn Sufna
Sinjar District Sincar İlçesi
Sinjar Sincar, Şengal
Tal Afar District Telafer İlçesi
Ayadia İyadi, İyaziye, Ayaziye
Mahalabiyah Muhallebiye
Tal Afar Telafer
Tel Keppe District Telkif İlçesi
Alqosh Elkuş, Alkuş
Dur-Sharrukin Horsabad
Nineveh Ninova, Neynava, Eski Musul, Koyuncuk, Yunus Peygamber, Nebi Yunus
Tel Keppe Telkif, Tel Keyf, Tilkaif, Telkaif
Qadisiyyah Governorate Kadisiye İli
Diwaniya District Divaniye İlçesi
Diwaniya Divaniye
Shamiya District Şamiye İlçesi
Shamiya Şamiye
Saladin Governorate Selahattin (Selahaddin) İli
Baiji District Beyci İlçesi
Baiji Beyci, Beci
Dujail (Al-Faris) District Düceyil İlçesi
Dujail Düceyil
Samarra District Samare İlçesi
Samarra Samare, Samera, Samarra, Samerra
Shirqat District Şirkat İlçesi
Assur Asur, Aşur, Şirkat, Şerkat, Kale-i Şirkat, Kale-i Şerkat, Kale-i Şarkat, Şarkat Kalesi
Shirqat Şirkat, Şarkat, Eş Şarkat
Tikrit District Tikrit İlçesi
Tikrit Tikrit
Tooz District Tuzhurmatu İlçesi
Amirli Amirli, Emirli
Bustamli Bestamlı, Bastamlı
Sulaiman Bek Muratlı, Süleyman Bey, Süleyman Beg, Süleyman Bek, Süleyman Beğ
Tuz Khurmatu Tuzhurmatu, Tuzhurmatı, Tuz Hurmatu, Tuzhurmata, Tuz, Tuzhurma, Tuz Hurma, Tuz Hurma Dağ
Yankjah Yenice, Yengice
Wasit Governorate Vasıt (Vasit) İli
Aziziyah District Aziziye İlçesi
Aziziyah Aziziye
Badra District Bedre İlçesi
Badra Bedre
Zurbatiyah Zırbatiye, Zurbatiye, Zarbatiye
Kut District Kut İlçesi
Kut Kut'ül Amare, Küt el Ammâre, Kutülamere, Kut'ül Ammare, Kut, Kuttülammare, Kuttülamare
Kurdistan Kürdistan, Kuzey Irak, Irak Kürdistan Bölgesel Yönetimi (IKBY)
Dohuk Governorate Duhok İli
Amadiya District İmadiye İlçesi
Amadiya İmadiye, Amediye, Amadiye
Dohuk District Duhok İlçesi
Dohuk Duhok, Dohuk, Duhuk
Simele District Simele İlçesi
Simele Simele, Semile, Sumail
Zakho District Zaho İlçesi
Zakho Zaho, Zahu
Erbil Governorate Erbil İli
Dashty Hawler District Kuştepe İlçesi
Qushtapa Kuştepe
Erbil District Erbil İlçesi
Erbil Erbil, İrbil
Koy Sinjaq District Köysancak İlçesi
Goptapa Göktepe
Koy Sanjaq Köysancak, Köy Sancak
Taqtaq Taktak, Tak Tak
Mergasor District Mergesur İlçesi
Barzan Barzan
Piran Piran
Zibar Zibar
Qandil Mountains Kandil Dağları
Rawandiz District Revanduz İlçesi
Rawandiz Revanduz, Revandiz, Revandız, Revandüz, Ravendüz, Ravanduz
Shaqlawa District Şaklava İlçesi
Harir Herir, Harir
Shaqlawa Şaklava, Şaklabad, Şaklı
Soran District Soran İlçesi
Soran Soran, Diyana
Halabja Governorate Halepçe İli
Halabja District Halepçe İlçesi
Sulaymaniyah Governorate Süleymaniye İli
Chamchamal District Cemcemal İlçesi
Aq Jallar Akçalar, Ağçalar
Chamchamal Cemcemal, Çemçemal
Qadir Karam Kadirkerem, Kadir Kerem, Kadir Karam
Sangaw Göktepe, Gök Tepe, Sengav
Darbandikhan District Derbendihan İlçesi
Darbandikhan Derbendihan
Dokan District Dukan İlçesi
Dokan Dukan, Dokan
Kalar District Kaler İlçesi
Kalar Kaler, Kalar
Penjwen District Pençvin İlçesi
Penjwen Pençvin
Pshdar District Pişder (Peşdar) İlçesi
Qaladiza Kaledize
Ranya District Raniye İlçesi
Ranya Raniye, Ranya, Ranye
Saidsadiq District Seyit Sadık İlçesi
Barzinjah Berzince
Saidsadiq Seyit Sadık
Shahrizor Şehrizor, Şehrizur, Şehr-i Zor, Şehr-i Zûr, Şehrezur, Şehrizor Ovası, Şehrizol, Şehrezul, Şehrizul, Şeherzul
Sharbazher District Şehripazar İlçesi
Sharbazher Şehripazar, Şehr-i Bâzar, Şehirpazar, Şehr-i Pazar, Şehribâzâr, Şarabazar
Sulaymaniyah District Süleymaniye İlçesi
Bazyan Baziyan
Sulaymaniyah Süleymaniye
Others
Lake Hammar Hammar Gölü

Israel
Acre Akka, Akre
Ashdod Aşdod, İsdud
Ashqelon Eşkalon, Aşkelon, Mecdel, Mücdel
Auja al-Hafir Hafır, Hafir, El Hafir
Bat Yam Bat Yam
Bayt 'Itab Beyt-i A'tâb
Bayt Jibrin Beyt-i Cireyn
Beersheba Berşeba, Bir es Saba, Birüssebi, Birü's Seb'a, Beerşeba, Birüsseb, Birussebi
Beit She'an Beysan
Dimona Dimona
Elat Eyle, Eylat, Elat, Ümmü Raşraş
Faluja Felluce
Hadera Hadera, Hüdeyre
Haifa Hayfa
Hittin Hattin, Hıttin
Jaffa Yafa
Jerusalem Kudüs, Batı Kudüs, Ürşalim
Lod Lod, Ludd, Lut
Mount Carmel Kurmul Dağı, Cebelü' Mer Ilyas, Cebelü' Nebi Ilyas
Mount of Olives Cebelü'z Zeytin, Zeytin Dağı
Mount Scopus Cebel-i Meşarif, İskopos Dağı,  Gözlem Dağı
Mulayha El Mulayha
Nahariyya Nahariye, Nehiriye
Nazareth Nasıra, Nasra
Negev Necef Çölü
Netanya Netanya
Qalansawe Kalansave, Kalansefe
Ramla Ramle, Remle
Safed Safed, Safet, Şafad
Sea of Galilee Celile Denizi, Taberiye Gölü
Tel Aviv Tel Aviv
Tiberias Tiberya, Taberiye, Tiberiye
Yavneh Yibne, Yübne

Italy
Acireale Yaç, Alyac
Agrigento Kirkent
Alcamo Menzilü'l Kamuk
Alessandria İskenderiye, İskendire, İskenderiyetü'l Rum
Ancona Ankone, Ankona
Apulia Polye, Apulya, Pulya, Pulye
Asinara Geyikli Ada
Bagheria Bagerya, Babü'l Gerib
Bari Bari, Medinetü'l Bari
Bologna Bolonya
Brindisi Pirindiz, Birindisi, Brindizi, Prendiz
Burano Urben
Cagliari Kagliari, Kalyarı
Calatafimi-Segesta Kaletü'l Fimi
Caltanissetta Kalatanisa, Kaletü'l Nisa
Caltavuturo Kaletü'l Ebu Tavir, Ebu Tavir
Canicattì Handakü'l Tin
Caorle Rih Kavorlo
Catanzaro Katansar
Catania Kataniye, Beledü'l Fil
Cefalù Gafludi
Civitavecchia Çivita Veko
Corsica, Sardinia, Baleares Gedelan Adaları, Batı Akdeniz Adaları
Enna Kasrü'l Yuhanna, Kasrü'l Yahya
Ferrara Firere, Firare, Porta Ferrar, Porta Ferrara
Florence Floransa, Firentin, Filorence
Foggia Foça
Gela Cela, Medinetü'l Emud
Genoa Cenova, Ceneviz, Cineviz
Giulianova Çulyanov, Çulyanova
Gorizia Görz
L'Aquila Liçeles Akula
Lanciano Lençano
Lascari Medinetü'l Askeri, Beledü'l Askeri
Livorno Ligurna, Aligorna, Alagorna, Alikurna, Alikorna, Livorna, Livurna
Loreto Lorito
Lucera Lugera, Luçera
Manfredonia Menferidonya, Mafrodonya
Mantua Mantovan, Mantova
Marsala Marsa-i Ali, Marsaali, Marsalı
Messina Mesine, Mesina, Misina
Milan Milano, Milan
Misilmeri Menzil-i Emir, Menzilü'l Emir
Modena Mutina
Monterotondo Montorotondo
Mount Etna Monto Cibil
Muggia Moye
Naples Napoli, Nablus, Nablusü'l Garp, Nablusü Rum, Nablusgarp, Polya Anabolusu, Anabolı, Anabolu, Kedelan Anabolısı
Orvieto Oruvet
Otranto Otranto, Hidrunt
Palermo Palermo, Balarm, Balarım, Bülrüm, El Medine
Palombara Sabina Polonbara
Pantelleria Cuhûdluk, Cuhûdlık, Çıfıtlık, Kavsara, Kasvara, Pantelarya
Pelagie Islands Pelagi Adaları
Perugia Piruç, Piruca
Pesaro Pazro
Pescara Peşkare, Peskere, Piskire
Peschici Bestice
Piedmont Piyamonde
Piombino Pinpin
Pisa Piza, Pize
Ponza Ponza
Porto San Giorgio Porto de Fermo
Portofino Has Liman
Ragusa Rağusa
Ravenna Revene, Royine
Regalbuto Regalbuto, Rahbalü'l Abut
Reggio Calabria Refah
Rimini Rimeno
Rome Roma, Medinet'ül Rum, Altınbaş, Rim
Castel Sant'Angelo Kastel de Sentencelo
San Pietro Island San Para
San Vito Lo Capo Sevite Vige, Çifte Viçe, Santa Viga
Sardinia Sardinya, Sardunya, Serdinye, Sardinye
Savoca Kaletü'l Zebut
Savona Savone
Sicily Sicilya, Cicilye, Cicilya, Çiçilya, Çeçilya, Misina
Stromboli Usturonkolo
Sulmona Selmona
Syracuse Seragoze, Sirakusa, Siragüsa, Sarkosta, Sarakusb, Sirakusb, Siraküs, Siraküza, Sirakuza
Tagliacozzo Telyekoc, Telyekoç
Taormina Serme, Termine, Tabarmin, Tormina, Medinetü'l Muizz, Muizziye
Taranto Taranda, Tarento
Trapani Trapani, Tırpan, Tırpani
Trieste Reşti, Tergeste, Tiriyeste, Triyeste
Turin Torino
Tuscany Toskana, Toşkana
Venezia Venedik, Bundukiye
Verona Verona, Birune
Vulcano Bolkan Adası
Zisa Zisa, El Aziz

Japan
Hokkaido Hokkaydo
Kyushu Kyüşu
Nagasaki Nagazaki

Jordan
Ajloun Aclun
Amman Amman
Aqaba Akabe
Irbid İrbid
Jerash Ceraş, Jeraş
Karak Kerek, Karak, Kerak
Ma'an Maan
Madaba Medeba
Mafraq Mafrak, Mazrak
Mu'tah Muta
Petra Petra, Vadi Musa
Qatraneh Kal'a-i Katran
Salt Salt
Tafilah Tafile
Zarqa Ayn-i Zerka

Kazakhstan
Abay Çurubay Nura
Aktau Akdağ
Aktobe Aktöbe, Aktepe, Aktopu
Almaty Almatı, Alma Ata, Almata
Astana Astana, Akmola, Nursultan
Atyrau Aşağı Yayık, Atıra, Atrav
Ayagoz Ayagöz
Baikonur Baykonur
Ilek River Elek, İllak
Ishim River Esil, İcim, İşim
Emba River Çam, Cem
Embi Embi, Çam
Fort-Shevchenko Ketikkala, Ketikkale, Gidikkale, Tupkaragan
Jankent Yenikent
Jezkazgan Cezkazgan
Karaganda Karaganda, Karagandı
Kokshetau Gökçedağ
Kostanay Kostanay, Kustanay
Kyzylorda Kızılorda, Akmeçet, Akmescit
Lake Balkhash Balkaş, Saban Göl
Mangyshlak Peninsula Mangışlak Yarımadası, Mankışlak 
Oral Yayık, Ural
Oskemen Öskemen
Otrar Turar, Farab, Yengi Kent, Yeni Kent, Yangı Kent, Tarban, Tutarband
Pavlodar Pavlodar, Kimakya, İmakya, Kereku
Petropavl Petropavlovsk, Petropavl, Kızılyar
Saray-Jük Saraycık, Küçük Saray
Sayram Sayram, Saryam, Esbicab, Espicab, İsbicab, İsficab, Beyza
Semey Yedi Saray, Semey, Alaşkale
Shymkent Çimkent, Şımkent
Taldykorgan Taldıkurgan
Taraz Taraz, Talas, Evliya Ata, Cambul
Temirtau Demirdağ
Turkistan Türkistan, Hazret, Hazret-i Türkistan, Yesi 
Ural River Yayık
Zhetysu Yedisu

Kenya
Malindi Melindi, Melinde
Mombasa Manbasa

Kosovo
Babin Most, Obilić or Babimoc, Obilić Derbent
Crkolez or Cërkolez Çırkolez
Đakovica or Gjakova Yakova, Yakofça, Cakova, Altuneli
Dečani or Deçani Deçan
Đeneral Janković or Hani i Elezit Elez Han
Glogovac or Gllogovc or Drenas Glogovça
Gnjilane or Gjilani Gölhan, Gilan, Geylan
Gušterica or Gushtericë e Ulët Aşağı Guşteriça
Istok or Istog İstok
Janjevo or Janjevë Yanova
Junik Yunik
Kačanik or Kaçanik Kaçana, Kaçanik
Klina or Klinë Klina
Kosovo Polje or Fushë Kosova Kosova Ovası, Karatavuk Ovası
Kosovska Kamenica Kameniça
Kosovska Mitrovica or Mitrovicë Mitroviça, Metrofçe, Mitroviçe, Metroviçe
Lepina or Lepi Lepinya, Lap
Leposavić or Leposaviq Leposaviç
Lipljan or Lipjan Lipyan
Mališevo or Malishevë Malişeva, Malisya
Mamuša or Mamushë Mamuşa, Mahmut Paşa
Mazgit Meşhed, Mescit
Novo Brdo or Novobërdë Novaberda, Novar, Novabırda, Novaberde, Nov Borda, Nobırda
Obilić or Obiliq or Kastriot Obiliç, Kastriot
Orahovac or Rahovec Rahova, Rahovça, Ravusa
Peć or Pejë İpek
Podujevo or Podujevë Poduyeva, Podiyeva
Prekaz Prekaz
Pristina or Prishtinë Priştina, Priştine, Piriştina
Prizren Prizren, Pirzerin, Benzerin, Perzerin
Srbica or Skënderaj Sırbiça
Staro Gracko or Grackë e Vjetër Eski Gaçko
Štimlje or Shtime İstimiye
Štrpce or Shtërpcë İşterpçe
Suva Reka or Suhareka Suvareka
Uroševac or Ferizaj Ferizay, Ferizovik, Firzovik
Vitina or Viti Vitina
Vučitrn or Vushtrri Vulçıtrin, Vıçıtırın, Velçetrin, Vuçıtrin, Vulçetrin, Vulçitrin
Zubin Potok Zubin Potok
Zvečan or Zveçan İzveçan, İzveçen

Kyrgyzstan
Balasagun Balasagun, Gobalık, Koz Ordu, Koz Oluş, Kuz Uluş
Balykchy Balıkçı
Batken Batken, Batkent
Bishkek Bişkek, Pişpek
Issyk Kul Isık Göl, Issık Göl
Jalal-Abad Celal Abad
Jeti-Ögüz Yedi Öküz
Kara-Balta Kara-Balta
Karakol Karakol
Kyzyl-Kiya Kızılkıya
Manas Manas
Naryn Narın
Osh Oş
Suyab Suyab, Ordukent, Ak-Beşim
Talas River Talas Irmağı
Tokmok Tokmak
Uzgen Özkent, Özçent, Özçend, Üzgen, Özgen

Latvia
Daugavgrīva Dünamünde
Daugavpils Dünaburg

Lebanon
Aabey Abeye
Aydamun Aydamun
Baalbek Balbek, Ba'albek
Beirut Beyrut
Beqaa Bekaa, Bika, Beka
Damour Dâmûr
Hasbaya Hasbeya
Kouachra Kavaşra, Kuvaşra
Nabatieh Nebatiye
Rahbeh Rahbe
Rashaya Raşeya, Reşeya
Riyaq Rayak
Sidon Sayda, Şayda
Sin el Fil Sinnü'l-Fil
Tripoli Trablusşam, Trablus, Trablus-ı Şam, Tarabulus Şam, Tarabulus, Tarabulus-i Şam
Tyre Sur, Tire, Şur

Libya
Ajaylat Uceylat, Acilat
Ajdabiya Cüdabiye
Bayda El-Beyda
Barca Berke, Berka
Benghazi Bingazi
Bani Walid Beni Velid, Beni Velit, Ben Velid
Brega Bureyka, Berka
Castelverde Garabulli, Karabolulu
Cyrenaica Sirenayka, Berke, Kirenayka
Derna Derne
Fezzan Fizan, Fizan Çölü, Fezan
Ghadames Gadamez, Gadamis
Gharyan Gıryan
Ghat Gat
Gulf of Bomba Ras et-tin
Jabal al Gharbi Cebel-î Garbi, Cebel-i Garbiyye
Khums Hums
Marj Meriç
Misrata Mısrata, Masurata, Misrata, Misrate
Msallata Musallata, Misillate, Müsellata, Mislata
Murzuk Murzuk
Nalut Nalut
Sabha Sebha
Shati' Şâti
Sirte Sirt, Surt, Sirte
Tajura Tacura, Tacure
Tarhuna Terhune
Tripoli Trablusgarb, Trablusgarp, Trablus, Tarablus, Garp Trablusu, Tarabulus, Mağrib Trablusı, Mağrib Trablusu
Tripolitania Trablusgarp Bölgesi
Tobruk Tobruk, Tomruk, Tubruk
Zawiya Zaviye
Zliten İzletin, Zıliten, Zletin

Lithuania
Klaipėda Klaypeda, Kaloypeda, Memel
Lithuania Litvanya, Lütenya
Trakai Trakay, Trok
Vilnius Vilna, Vilniya, Ulu Şehir

Luxembourg
Luxembourg City Lüksemburg
Schengen Şengen

Madagascar
Antananarivo Antananarivo, Tana
Madagascar Madagaskar, Vakvak Yurdu

Malaysia
Malacca Malaka, Malakka, Melaka

Malta
Birgu Birgu
Burmarrad Bür Murad
Comino Kamuna, Uluç Ali
Cospicua Birmula
Fontana Aynü'l Kebir, Ayn el-Kebir
Fort Ricasoli Buruka, Rikasoli
Fort Saint Elmo Santarma, Sahterme
il-Hamrun Hemrun, Beledü'l Hesne
Għajnsielem Ayn üs-Selam
Ġgantija Devin Kulesi
Gozo Koza, Gozo, Havdiş, Küçük Malta
Gzira Cezire, Ceziretü'l Iskof
Marsa Mersa, Marsa
Marsamxett Harbour Mersa Muscet, Moranso Limanı
Marsaxlokk Marsalşolok, Mersaşolok, Marsatü'l Şiluk, Marsa el-Şiluk
Mellieħa Meliha
Mdina Medine, Medinetü'l Sur
Naxxar Nazar
Qormi Kurmi, Kurumi
Sliema Kurtine, Selimiye
Valletta Beled, Beledü'l Malta
Victoria Rabat
Xewkija Şevkiye
Zejtun Zeytun

Mexico
Chapultepec Çapul Tepe

Moldova
Armanca, Rîșcani Armanca
Baimaclia, Cantemir Baymaklı
Baimaclia, Căușeni Baymaklı
Bălăbănești, Criuleni Balabaneş
Balmaz Balmaz
Bălți Balçık
Bardar Bardar
Basarabeasca Besarabka
Bender Bender, Benderabad
Bessarabia Besarabya, Basaraba
Beștemac Beştamak
Borogani Borazan
Budăi, Ialoveni Buğday
Budăi, Taraclia Buğday
Cahul Kartal, Kagul, Gölbaşı, Kogul, Kartal Ovası, Kaholu
Căinari Kaynar
Cairaclia Kayraklı
Calfa Kalfa
Camenca Kamenka, Kamanke
Cantemir Kandemir
Capaclia Kapaklı
Căplani Kaplan, Kaplan Giray
Caracui Karaköy
Caragaș Karaağaç
Carahasani Karahasan
Căușeni Kavuşan, Kavşan, Favşan
Cazangic Kazancık
Cenac Çanak
Chioselia Köseli
Chişinău Kişinev, Kişinov, Kışla Nova, Keşene, Akbaş Keşenev
Chițcani Çığırtkan
Cimișlia Cimişli, Kamışlı
Ciobanovca Çobanova
Ciobanovca, Rîșcani Çobanova
Cioburciu, Ștefan Vodă Koburcu
Cioburciu, Transnistria Çuburca, Çoburcu
Cîșla, Cantemir Kışla
Cîșla, Telenești Kışla
Ciuluc Kuyuluk
Cobani Koban
Cogâlnic River Kunduk Nehri
Colibași Kulbaşı, Kolbaşı
Cremenciug Kermencik
Crocmaz Korkmaz
Cuciurgan Reservoir Kuruçukur Gölü, Kuçurgan, Göçürgen
Dermengi Değirmenci
Dubăsari Tepesarı, Dembosarı, Tembosarı, Tombasar, Rombasar
Dușmani Düşman
Edineţ Yedinci
Ermoclia Irmaklı
Enichioi Yeniköy
Giurgiulești Çoçra
Huzun, Strășeni Uzun
Iagorlîc Yagorlık, Eğrilik
Larga Larga
Lipcani Lipkan
Malcoci Malkoç
Palanca, Ștefan Vodă Yanık Palanka
Pelinia Pelin
Popeasca Popofça
Prut River Burat, Purut, Bırud
Rașcov Raşkova, Raşko
Rîbnița Ribniçe, Rıdvaniçse
Saca Saka
Sadîc Sadık
Soroca Suriyaka, Sorok, Soroka, Şorika
Ștefan Vodă Kızıl
Stîrcea, Glodeni Küçük Düşman
Sturzovca Usturzofça
Talmaza Talmaz, Dalmaz, Yılmaz
Taraclia Taraklı, Tarakliye
Tătărești, Cahul Tatareş
Tătărești, Strășeni Tatareş
Turunchuk River Turuncuk Deresi
Gagauzia Gagavuzyeri, Gagavuzya, Gökoğuzya
Avdarma Avdarma
Baurci Baurçu
Beşalma Beşalma, Beşelma
Beşghioz Beşgöz
Bugeac Bucak
Carbalia Kurbağalı, Kırbaalı
Cazaclia Kazayak
Ceadâr-Lunga Çadır, Çadır-Lunga
Chioselia Rusă Köseli Rus
Chiriet-Lunga Kiriyet, Kiryat
Chirsova Başköy
Cioc-Maidan Çok-Maydan, Çok-Meydan
Cişmichioi Çeşmeköy
Comrat Komrat, Kumrat, Kömürat
Congaz Kongaz
Copceac Kıpçak
Cotovscoe Kırlannar
Dezghingea Dezgince
Etulia Tülüköy
Ferapontievca Parapontika
Gaidar Haydar
Joltai Coltay
Tomai Tomay
Vulcăneşti Valkaneş

Mongolia
Gobi Desert Gobi Çölü
Karakorum Karakurum
Khovd Hovd, Kobdo
Lake Khövsgöl Göksu Göl
Ölgii Ölke, Ölgey
Ordu-Baliq Ordu-Balık, Karabalgasun, Karabalsagun, Karabalasagun, Mubalık
Orkhon Valley Orhun Vadisi
Otukan Ötüken, Ötügen
Ulaanbaatar Ulan Batur, Kızıl Bahadır, Urga, Al Bahadır

Montenegro
Ada Bojana Boyana Adası, Buna Adası, Gökbaşı
Bar Bar, Tivar, Anti Bezi, Antibari
Bay of Kotor Nova Körfezi, Nove Körfezi
Bihor Bihor
Budva Budova, Buduva, Budeva, Boduva, Bodove
Cetinje Çetine, Çetinye
Herceg Novi Kastelnova, Kastelnovo, Kastelnove, Kastal Nove, Yeni Hersek, Nova, Novi, Nove, Kala-i Novi, Noveteyn
Kolašin Kolaşin
Kotor Kotar, Kotur, Katur
Lovćen Karadağ
Njeguši Genonyusi
Nikšić Nikşık, Nikşik, Onogost
Perast Prast
Pješivci Piyove
Podgorica Podgörice, Podgoriç, Podgoriçe, Böğürtlen, Depedöğen, Burguriçe, Budguriçe, Posgorice, Potgoriçe
Risan Resne, Resna, Risna, Risan
Rose Roze, Porto Dile Roze, Porto Dileduze
Spuž İşpozi
Sutomore Tabliye
Sutorina Sitorine, Aya İrini
Ulcinj Ülgün, Olgun, Ölgün, Ulgün, Ülgin, Dolçini, Dulçini, Ülcün, Ulçin
Virpazar Pazar
Žabljak Zabik, Yabilyak, Yablak
Sandžak Sancak, Yeni Pazar Sancağı
Berane Berane, Piran
Bijelo Polje Akova
Gusinje Gosine, Gusinye, Gusine, Gusane
Plav Palav
Pljevlja Taşlıca, Taşluca
Rožaje Roşya, Ruşye, Rojay
Tomaševo Şahoviç, Şahoviçi

Morocco
Agadir Agadir
Azemmour Zamur
Cape Bojador Bozabur Burnu
Casablanca Kazablanka, Nebfe, Dar'ül Beyza, Dar'ül Beyda
Essaouira Mugadire
Fez Fas, Fes, Fez
Hoceima El Hüceyma
Ksar el-Kebir Kasrülkebir, Elkazar el Kebir, Vadisseyl, Vâdiü'l-Mehâzîn, Vadiyüsseyl
Larache El Araiş
Marrakech Marakeş, Merakiş
Massa Mese
Oujda Uçta, Uçda, Ucda, Enked
Rabat Rabat
Ras Nouadhibou Akburun
Río de Oro Altun Irmağı, Batı Sahra
Salé Selâ, Sali
Tangier Tanca
Tétouan Tetuvan

Mozambique
Sofala Sofala, Sofalau

Myanmar
Meiktila Mektila
Rakhine State Arakan Eyaleti
Sittwe Akyab
Thayet Tayet, Tayetmo
Yangon Rangun, Yangon

Netherlands

North Korea
Pyongyang Pyönyang

North Macedonia
Ajimatovo Hacı Ahmetli
Bekirlija Bekirli
Berovo Berova
Bitola Manastır
Debar Debre, Aşağı Debre, Debre-i Bala, Dibre, Dibra
Delčevo Sultaniye, Delçova
Demir Hisar Demir Hisar
Demir Kapija Demir Kapu
Dojran Doyran, Doyuran, Toyran
Dolneni Dolyan, Dolyani
Dorfulija Dorfullu
Džepište Çepişte, Cepişte
Gevgelija Gölgeli, Gevgeli, Gevgili, Gevgelü, Gelgeri
Gostivar Gostivar, Gostvar
Karatmanovo Karatmanlı
Kavadarci Tikveş, Kavadar
Kičevo Kırçova, Kırcaova, Kıraçova
Kočani Koçani, Koçana
Kodžadžik Kocacık
Kratovo Karatova, Kıratova, Kratova, Kırat Ova
Kriva Palanka Kirve Palanka, Eğridere, Eğripalanka, Eğri Palanga, Bayram Paşa Hisarı
Kruševo Kuruşova, Kırşova
Kumanovo Kumanova, Komanova, Kuman Ova
Lavci Lahça
Lozovo Cumalı
Mavrovo Mavrova
Negotino Negotin, Negutin
Ohrid Ohri*, Uhri, Ahrida
Oteševo Hoteşeva, Doleşeva, Astarova
Pehčevo Osmaniye
Plačkovica Aktaş dağı
Prespa Prespe
Prilep Pirlepe*, Perlepe
Probištip Probiştip*
Radoviš Radoviş*, Radovişte, Erdoşta
Resen Resne*
Šar Mountains Şar Dağları*, Şardağ
Skopje Üsküp*
Čair Çayır
Ciglana Teneke Mahalle
Dukancik Dükkancık
Gazi Baba Gazi Baba
Idrizovo İdrisova
Indžikovo Encikova, İncikova
Kisela Voda Ekşi Su, Ekşisu
Madžari Mezarlık
Madzir Maalo Muhacir Mahallesi
Petrovec İbrahimova
Saraj Saray
Stračinci Istraçince, Straçince
Topansko Pole Tophane
Štip İştip*, İştib
Struga Ustruga, Usturga, Usturka
Strumica Ustrumca, Usturumca
Studeničani İstudeniçan
Sveti Nikole Kiliseli, Kliseli, Keliseli
Tetovo Kalkandelen*, Kalkandere, Tetova
Upper Reka Rekalar
Valandovo Valandova, Valandiva, Velendive
Veles Köprülü*, Köpürlü, Köprili, Kuprili
Vinica Viniçe, Viniça

Norway
Bergen Bergen, Bercen
Kristiansund Kristiyan Sunda
Skagerrak İskacrak
Spitsbergen İspitberg
Trondheim Durontem

Oman
Dhofar Governorate Zufar, Dufar
Khuriya Muriya Islands Kurya Murya Adaları
Masirah Island Mesire
Musandam Governorate Musandam
Muscat Maskat, Muskat
Ras al Hadd Kalhat

Pakistan
Debal Daybul
Indus River İndüs Nehri, İndus, Sind
Peshawar Peşaver, Pesh Habor
Sindh Sind

Palestine
Abwein Abaveyn
Beit Jala Beyt Cala, Beyt el Cala
Bethlehem Beytülehem, Beytü'l Lahm, Beyt el Lahm, Beytü'l Lahim
Dead Sea Lut Gölü, Ölüdeniz
East Jerusalem Doğu Kudüs, Kudüs Şerif, Kuds-i Şerif, Kudüs-i Şerif
Gaza Gazze
Hebron El Halil, Halil er Rahman, Halilü'r Rahman
Jenin Cenin
Jericho Eriha
Jordan River Ürdün Nehri
Kalandia Kalandiye
Khan Yunis Han Yunus
Nablus Nablus
Ni'lin Na'leyn, Na'lin
Nuseirat Nuseyrat
Qalqilyah Kalkilya
Rafah Refah
Ramallah Ramallah
Saffa Saffa, Safa
Temple Mount (Masjid Al Aqsa) Tapınak Dağı, Tapınak Tepesi, Harem'ül Şerif, Harem-i Şerif, Harem'üş Şerif, Harem el Şerif, Mescid-i Aksa, Beyt-i Mukaddes, Beyt'ül Mukaddes
Dome of the Rock Kubbet-üs-Sahra
Foundation Stone Muallak Taşı
Tulkarm Tulkarim
West Bank Batı Şeria, Yahudiye ve Samarya

Papua New Guinea
Port Moresby Pot Mosbi

Poland
Chełmsko Śląskie İskomberg
Gdańsk Dansık, Danşika
Gierów Gıyerova, Gürova
Głuchołazy Ziyegal
Kielce Kelce
Kraków Krakov, Krakuva, Kırakıvu, Karakovi, Krakova
Lubawka Liyebav
Otmuchów Otmaşav
Podwysokie Podoysoki
Pomerania Pomeranya, Pomeran
Silesia Silezya
Smolenka İsmolençka
Świdnica Esvedniz, Eskudniz
Szczecin İsizine, Esizine, Ştetin
Tarnów Tarnof
Warszawa  Varşova, Varşav
Wrocław Breslava, Brasleva, Prasleva, Breslau, Breslo

Portugal
Albufeira Buhara
Alcacer do Sal Kasrü'l Ebu Deniz
Alcáçovas Kasaba
Alcántara Kentere, El-Kantere
Alcobaça Kubaşe, Kubaşa
Algarve Algarve, El-Garb, Gerib
Algés Beledü'l Ceyiz, Ceyiz, Ciyiz
Algoz El Güz, El Oğuz
Aljezur Cezayir
Almada Hisnü'l Medine
Almeirim Medinetü'l Meryem, Hisnü'l Meryem
Almodôvar Müdavver
Alqueidão da Serra Keyatün
Aveiro Aveiro, Übeyre
Azores Azor Adaları
Cabras Islets Kopis
Faial Island Firgal
Flores Island Oskolores
Graciosa Finoki
Pico Island Epiko, Eviko
Santa Maria Island Santa Marya
São Jorge Island San Jorjo
São Miguel Island San Mikal
Braga Braga, Babü'l Garbiye
Beja Becayü'z Zeyt, Beca üz-Zeyt, Beca, Baca
Bobadela Ebu Abdullah
Cacém Keşem
Coimbra Kulumriye, Kulunbire, Kulumbriye, Kuvimbire, Kovambra, Kulumeriye
Évora Yabüre, Yafüre, Yebure
Faro Faro, Farun, Harun, Bür Harun, Uhşunübe
Fátima Fatima, Fadime
Lisboa Lizbon, Üşbune, Lişbune, İşbuna, Leşbuna, Leşbune
Loulé Ulye
Madeira Madeyra, Mazera
Marvão Mervan, Kasrü'l Mervan
Moura Menice, Mure
Ourem Abdülhicaz
Palmela Balmallah
Porto Porto, Uburtu, Ubürtü
 Zaviye
Santarém Şantarin, Şenterin
Segura Şükriye
Setúbal Setubal, Şetüber, Şetuber
Silves Silves, Şilb, Şilib
Tavira Tabire, Tebire

Romania
Banat Banat
Ada Kaleh Ada Kale, Adakale, Ada-i Kebir, Yeni İrşova, Yeni Orşova
Babacaia Babakaya, Babakayası
Băile Herculane Lazarethane
Bocşa Bogça, Bokşen
Caransebeş Sebeş, Şebeş, Karansebeş, Şeşbeş
Cenad Çanad
Cerna River Zerne Nehri
Ciacova Çakova
Coșava Karaşova
Denta Dante, Deda, Detay
Dudeştii Vechi Beşenova
Făget Façet
Fârdea Fırdına
Ghilad Kılad
Iron Gates Demirkapı
Jebel Cebel
Lugoj Lugoş, Lügoş, Logoş, Lagoş
Margina Marzine, Marcina
Mehadia Mehadiye, Muhadiye, Mehadya
Moldova Nouă Modava, Boşnak, Mudava, Madova, Mudova
Obad Ohat
Orşova Orşova, Irşova, İrşova, İrşova-i Atik, Eski İrşova, Ruşava, Rişova, Arşova, İrşeve, İrşive
Pădureni, Arad Erdöç
Pădureni, Timiş Erdevik, Ligit
Reşiţa Reşce
Șemlacu Mare Büyük Şemlik
Șemlacu Mic Küçük Şemlik
Timișoara Temeşvar, Tımışvar, Tamışvar, Tameşvar, Dimişkar
Dobruja Dobruca, Kuzey Dobruca
23 August Büyük Tatlıcak, Balaban Tatlıcak
Abrud Malçıova, Molçova, Mulç Ova
Adamclisi Adam Kilise, Adem Kilise, Azim Kilise
Agigea Acıçay, Acıca, Aziziye
Agighiol Acıgöl, Acıgül
Alba Akkadın
Albeşti Akbaş, Sarıgöl, Sarıgül
Albina Balcı
Aliman Aliman
Almălău Elmalı, Almalı, Elmalı Bük
Amzacea Hamzaca, Hamzaça, Hamza Ağa
Ardealu Hasanlar, Kasanlar, Hasanköy, Hasancı
Arsa Kopukçu, Kopuzcu, Kopuzcu Murad, Ay Doğmuşlar, Kapıcı
Atmagea Atmaca, Atmacalar
Babadag Babadağ, Baba, Babadağ Kasaba, Babadağ Hisar, Sarı Saltuk Baba Tekkesi
Baia Hamamcı, Üçgöz
Balabancea Balabanca
Băltenii de Jos Aşağı Karasöğüt, Aşağı Kara Suat
Băltenii de Sus Yukarı Karasöğüt, Yukarı Kara Suat
Băneasa Paraköy
Bărăganu Osmanfakı, Osmanfakih, Osmanbakı, Osmanfaki Pınarcık
Beidaud Beydavut
Beștepe Beştepe
Biruinţa Murathan, Küçük Murat, Küçük Murathan, Murathan Zir
Brebeni Çukurköy, Çukurluköy
Bugeac Bucak
Căciulaţi Çalmaca, Çalmarca
Calfa Kalfa
Călugăreni Kaçamak
Camena Kamena, Kamana
Canlia Kanlı
Capidava Kaleköy, Kale
Căprioara Caferka
Caraorman Karaorman
Carcaliu Karaçalı, Karakale
Cârjelari Kırcılar, Kırcallar
Carvăn Kervan
Căscioarele Mamuşlu, Mahmuzlu, Mahmuzlu Halil
Casian Şeramet, Şeremet, Şirmerddüm
Casicea Kaşıkçı
Casimcea Kasımca, Kasımça, Kazımca
Câşliţa Kemalbey
Castelu Köstel, Köseler, Küstel, Kösterli
Caugagia Kavgacı
Ceamurlia de Jos Küçük Çamurlu, Aşağı Çamurlu, Çamurlu, Türk Çamurlusu
Ceamurlia de Sus Yeni Kazak, Büyük Çamurlu, Yukarı Çamurlu, Tatar Çamurlusu
Ceatalchioi Çatalköy
Cerbu Hacı Ömer
Cerchezu Çerkezköy
Cerna Karacalar, Çerna
Cernavodă Boğazköy, Akkerman Boğazkesen-Giberan
Cetatea Asırlık, Hisarlık, Hasarlık
Cheia Kirişlik, Kireçlik, Kireşlik, Kirecilik
Chilia Veche Eski Kili, Eski Kiliye, Eski Kilya, Eski Kale
Chirnogeni Güvenli, Kögenli, Gökmeli, Güğümlü
Ciobăniţa Acemler
Ciobanu Çoban Kuyusu
Ciocârlia de Jos Küçük Bülbül, Kişkene Bülbül, Kışkene Bülbül, Bülbül Cedid, Yeni Bülbül
Ciocârlia de Sus Büyük Bülbül, Balaban Bülbül, Üyken Bülbül, Bülbül Atik, Eski Bülbül
Ciucurova Çukurova, Çukurluova
Cloşca, Constanţa Musul, Musluk
Cloşca, Tulcea Davutça 
Cobadin Kobadin, Kubadın, Kop Aydın, Kubadin Bey, Kubadin, Kutbeddin
Cochirleni Kökerlen, Kökirlen, Kökerlan
Cogealac Kocalak
Colelia Kuleli, Kaleköy, Kubbeli
Colina Kara Habil, Karaybil, Kara Habir, Kara İbil, Kara Ebil, Caraybil
Comana Mustafa Hacı, Mustafa Fakih, Mustafa Kuyusu
Conacu Beşoğul, Beşağıl
Constanţa Köstence, Küstence
Corbu de Jos Aşağı Kargalık, Küçük Kargalık
Corbu de Sus Yukarı Kargalık, Büyük Kargalık, Kargalık Tatar, Karga Tatar
Coroana Kadıköy, Kadı
Coșlugea Kozluca, Kızılca Veli, Hoşluca
Cotu Văii Kiracı, Çıracı, Çırak Kuyusu
Crângu Kara Ahmet, Karamat
Credinţa Sofular
Crișan Kapıcı
Crucea Satışköy, Satıcı
Cuiugiuc Kuyucuk, Garvan Kuyucuğu, Garvan Kuyucuk, Kuyucak, Küçük
Cumpăna Haşiduluk, Hası Döllük, Hası Türklük, Hası Dölük, Hasdörlük, Astorluk
Curcani Kertikpınar, Ketikpınar
Cuza Vodă Dokuz Oğul, Dokuz Ağıl, Dokuzol, Dokuzoğlu, Dokuzoğulları
Dăeni Daya
Darabani Davulköy, Davullu, Davulluköy
Deleni Yenice
Dobromir Dobromir Zir, Dobromir
Dorobanțu, Constanţa Bilaller, Bilaller Kışlası, Kocak-Bilal, Koca Bilal
Dorobanțu, Tulcea Ayıorman
Dropia Derinköy, Dereköy
Dulceşti Küçük Tatlıcak, Kişkene Tatlıcak, Tatlıcak Sağır
Dulgheru Dülger
Dumbrăveni Hayranköy, Hayran, Divane Hayran, Delü Hayran, Ayranköy
Dunărea Boğazcık
Eforie Eforye, Tekirgöl Movila, Karmen Silva
Enisala Yenisala, Yenisala Kale
Esechioi Eşeköy, Eseköy, İsaköy, Esedli, İsa Kariyesi, İsa
Făclia Fakriye
Făgăraşu Nou Karıklar, Sarıklar, Arıklar
Fântâna Mare, Constanța Başpınar, Başpınar Pazarlı
Fântâna Mare, Tulcea Başpınar, Başpınar Pazarlı
Fântâna Oilor Koyunpınar
Fântânele İnançeşme, İmamçeşme, İğnehan Çeşme, İktiman Çeşmesi
Floreşti İslam Cafer
Floriile Bakkuyusu, Bağkuyusu, Baki kuyusu
Furca Bekter, Bahtiyarköy
Furnica İskender, İskender Bey, İşkender
Gălbiori Sarıca, Saraç, Sarıca Kebir, Sarıca Sağır
Gârliţa Gırliçe
Garvăn Karga
General Scărişoreanu Engez, Engez Kebir, Engez Bala
Ghindărești Dizdar
Gorgova Görgüova, Gurguva
Goruni Veliköy, Kara Veli, Derzi Veli
Grădina Toksofu, Dokuzsofu
Grăniceru Kanlı Çukur
Greci Soğanlık
Grindu Pisica
Gura Dobrogei Kıvırcık
Hagieni Hacılar
Hamcearca Hançer
Hârşova Hırşova, Hırsova, Hırs Ova, Hışrova
Haţeg Arabacı, Arabacılar
Horia, Constanţa Musabey, Musubey, İsabey, Muslu Bey
Horia, Tulcea Ortaköy
I. C. Brătianu Azaklı, Azarlı
Iazurile Kalika
Independența Bayramdede
Ion Corvin Kuzgun, Dursun Baba Tekkesi, Kuzgun-i Balaban Baba Tekkesi, Kuzgunpınarı
Isaccea İsakçı, İsakça, İshakça, İshakçı, Sakçı
Istria Karanasuf, Kara Nasuf, Karanasuh
Iulia Çineli, Çınar Obası
Ivrinezu Mare Büyük İvrinez, Büyük Evrenos, Evrenos Kuyusu
Ivrinezu Mic  Küçük İvrinez, Küçük Evrenos
Izvoarele Alibeyköy, Alibey
Izvoru Mare Mahmutkuyusu, Mahmudkuzusu, Mahmudkuyusu
Jurilovca Jurilofca
Lake Bugeac Bucak
Lake Razelm Rasim Gölü
Lake Siutghiol Sütgöl
Lake Tașaul Taşağıl, Taşavlu
Lake Techirghiol Tekirgöl, Tekfurgöl
Lanurile Ebeköy, Habib Bey
Lăstuni Hacılar, Hacı Oğul, Hacıbey, Hacı Gazi
Lazu Laz Mahalle, Laz, Lazköy
Lespezi Tekeköy, Tekkeköy, Teke
Limanu Karaağaçkulak, Karaçuklu, Karaşkulak, Karaağaç Kulağı, Karaağaç
Lipnița Lipniçe
Lumina Koca Ali, Kocaali, Kocalı, Hoca Ali, Emirli Hoca, Kara Hendek, Kocali
Luminiţa, Constanța Şahman, Şeyh Aman, Şaman, Şadman
Luminiţa, Tulcea Rum Ali, Urumbey, Rumbey, Rumbeyi
Lungeni Uzunlar, Uzun Oğul
Măcin Maçin, Maçın
Măgura Dokuzağaç
Măgurele Aygır Ahmet
Mahmudia Mahmudiye
Mamaia Mamay, Mamaya
Mangalia Mankalya, Mangalya, Mankaliye, Mangaliye, Mankalye, Mankale, Pangalya, Minkalya
Medgidia Mecidiye, Karasu, Karasu Pazarcık
Mereni Enge Mahale, Yeni Mahalle, Kence Mahalle, Yenice, Yenice Mahallesi
Meşteru Kanat Kalfa
Mihai Bravu Kamber, Kanberköy
Mihai Viteazu Sarıyurt, Küçük İlyas
Mihail Kogălniceanu, Constanţa Kara Murat, Kara Muratlı, Kara Murad, Kara Muradlı, Kara Murad Kuyuları, Karamurat
Mihail Kogălniceanu, Tulcea Yeniköy, Yenice, Yeniceköy
Mina Altân Tepe Altıntepe, Altıtepe
Mineri Kışla
Mioriţa Kadıkışla, Kalikışla
Mircea Vodă, Constanţa Çelebiköy, Çelebi, Nasuh Çelebi
Mircea Vodă, Tulcea Acıpınar
Mirceşti Demirci, Demirci Cedid
Mireasa Gelincik, Gelencik, Sırt Gelincik
Miriştea Edilköy, Adilköy, Adiller, Adil, Divane Adilbey, Adil Kuyusu
Moşneni Perveli, Pervel, Pervalı, Pir Veli
Movila Verde Kızıl Murat, Kızıl Murad
Moviliţa Musurat, Nusret, Nusredler, Nusretlerli, Musavvirat
Murfatlar Murfatlar, Mürüvvetler, Mürvetler, Murvat Kebir, Muravat Kebir, Mutatlar
Murighiol Morgöl
Nalbant Nalbant, Nalbandköy, Nalbandoğlu
Năvodari Karakum, Karaköy, Karakoyun
Nazarcea Nazarca, Nazarça, Nazar
Neatârnarea Kayalıdere
Negreşti Karabağ, Kara Baki
Negru Vodă Karaömer, Ömerbey, Karaömer Kuyusu
Nicolae Bălcescu, Constanţa Danaköy
Nicolae Bălcescu, Tulcea Başköy, Baş Kariyesi
Niculițel Başköy
Nifon Siganka
Nisipari Karatay
Nistoreşti Küçük Köy, Koçi Bey, Koçi, Koçulu Bey, Koçili Bey
Nuntaşi Düğüncü, Döğenci, Doğancı, Doğancılar, Düğünce
Oituz Oytuz, Estehr
Olteni Demirci, Demirci Atik
Osmancea Osmançay, Osmancı, Osmanca
Ostrov Ada, Ada Kariyesi
Ovidiu Kanara, Kanarya, Kamalı, Kanarı, Kanare
Pădureni Nasreddin, Nasreddin Bala
Palazu Mic Taş Ağıl Palas, Palaz, Palas Köy
Panduru Potur
Pantelimon Çatalköy
Peceneaga Peçenek, Peçenek Ağa
Pecineaga Peçenek, Gerencik, Gelincik
Pelinu Karaköy
Periș Armutlu, Armutluca
Petroșani Köseler
Piatra Taşağıl, Taşavlu
Pietreni Kokarca, Kokarça, Kokarca Kuyu
Plopeni Kavaklar, Kulaklar, Kavlaklar
Plopul Beybucak, Beybucağı
Poarta Albă Alakapu, Alakapı
Poeniţa Borunca, Burunca
Poiana Horozlar
Potârnichea Abdullahköy, Abdullah, Abdül, Abdülbey
Râmnicu de Jos Aşağı Remlik
Râmnicu de Sus Yukarı Remlik
Rândunica Kongaz
Rariştea Bezirgan, Bezirgan Pınarı
Răzoarele Kuru Orman
Remus Opreanu Alibeyçayır
Runcu Terziköy, Terzi Veli, Terzi, Küçük Terzi
Sabangia Sabancı
Săcele Peletli, Pelitli
Sălcioara Karamanköy, Karamanlı Hüseyin, Karaman, Kara Harman
Saligny Azize, Aziziye, Aziz
Sâmbăta Nouă Hacı Avat, Doyran, Doyuran
Saraiu Saray
Sarichioi Sarıköy
Sarighiol de Deal Sarıgöl
Sarinasuf Sarı Nasuf, Sarı Nasuh
Satu Nou, Constanţa Yeniköy, Yeni
Satu Nou, Tulcea Yeniköy, Satu
Schitu Mancapınar
Seimeni Seymenköy, Seymenler, Seğmenköy, Seğmenler, Büyük Seymenköy, Büyük Seğmenler
Seimenii Mici Küçük Seymenköy, Küçük Seğmenler
Sfântu Gheorghe Hıdırlez, Kadirlez, Hızırilyas
Sibioara Çıkrıkçı
Siliştea Taşpınar, Silişte
Sinoe Kasapköy, Kasaplı
Șipotele Gölpınar
Şiriu Şirin, Sırın
Slava Cercheză Çerkez Slavası, Salva, Yeni Kazak
Slava Rusă Kızılhisar, Kızıl Hisarlık, Islava, Kızılsar
Smârdan Geçit
Ştefan cel Mare Bazasköy
Stejaru, Constanţa Karapelit, Karapelitli
Stejaru, Tulcea Eskibaba, Eskidede
Straja Mehmedçay, Mambetçi, Mehmedce
Strunga Kışla
Stupina Erkeşek, Erkeçik, Erkesek
Sulina Sülne, Sünne, Şalina, Sulina
Târguşor Pazarlı, Pazarlık
Tariverde Tanrıverdi
Tătaru Azaplar
Techirghiol Tekirgöl, Tekfurgöl, Tuzla
Țepeș Vodă Körçeşme
Topalu Topal
Topolog Topaloğlu, Topalova
Topraisar Toprağı Sarı, Toprak Hisar, Yeniceği Kara Toprak Hisar, Topraysar
Tortoman Tortoman
Tufani Karaağaç, Küçük Karaağaç, Sarıca Karaağaç, Karagaş
Tulcea Tulça, Tolçi, Tolci, Tulca, Tolçı, Tolça, Tolçu
Turcoaia Türkova
Turda Armutlu
Tuzla Tuzla
Unirea Osmanu
Urluia Uğurluköy, Uğurlu
Uzlina Suleli, Silleli
Văcăreni Vakar
Vadu Karaharman, Karaharman Kalesi
Vâlcele Valalı, İflaklı, Veli Ali, Ulahlı, Eflaklı
Valea Dacilor Hendek Karaköy, Hendek Karakuyusu, Hendekkarakuyusu
Valea Nucarilor Sarıgöl
Valea Seacă Omurca, Umurca, Ömürçay
Valea Teilor Meydanköy
Văleni Yenişenli, Emşenli, Yenişenliği
Valu lui Traian Hasanca, Hasançay, Kara Hasan
Vama Veche Yılanlık, İlanlık, Hanlık, Yılan
Vânători Aşçılar, Haydarköy
Vârtop Deli Rus, Deli Oruç, Delürüç, Divane-Oruç, Oruçhan, Deluruç
Vasile Alecsandri Tüztemel, Testemel
Veteranu İdriskuyusu
Viile Beylik, Beycik Mehmed
Viişoara Kaçamak
Viroaga Kalfaköy, Mahmuzlu Kalfa
Vişina Paşakışla
Visterna Visterna
Vlahii Ulahköy, Vlahköy
Vulturu Kartal
Zebil Sebil, Sebil İlyas, Zebil
Zorile Kerimkuyusu
Moldavia Boğdan, Buğdan, Moldavya, Moldovya, Moldova
Bacău Baka, Bako
Bârlad Berlat, Birlat, Barlad, Birlad, Burlat, Bilad
Botoşani Potşan, Podşan, Bodiçan, Botacani, Botocani
Buhoci Beygir
Cârlibaba Kirlibaba
Covurlui Kurloy, Kaverloy
Dorohoi Durukoy, Torogoy
Fălciu Falcı, Falçı
Focşani Fokşan, Fuhşan, Fokşani, Fohşan
Galaţi Kalas, Galas, Galata, Galaç, Kalat, Gılas
Huși Huş
Iaşi Yaş, Yassı, Yensu
Neamț River Niyamiç Irmağı, Ozana Irmağı
Oituz Otuz
Piatra Neamț Piyatre, Peatra
Podu Turcului Türk Köprüsü
Putna Patna
Racova, Vaslui Racova
Rădăuți Radoviçe
Scânteia Iskıntı
Șendreni Serdar
Siret River Siret nehri
Stănița İstaniçe
Ștefănești Istafaneş
Suceava Suçava, Suçeva, Seçova, Suçuva, Soçova, Sokçova
Târgu Neamț Niyamiç, Benamiç, Neyamço, Nemeç, Nemet
Tecuci Tehek-ucu, Tekuç, Teküç, Tekviç
Țuțora Çecora, Cecora, Çoçora, Çuçura, Çuçara, Çuçora, Çeçora, Tutora
Tutova Totova, Tavtova
Valea Albă, Neamț Akdere
Vaslui Vaselu, Vaslu, Vasilev, Vasluy, Valasu, Avazlu, Vasiluy
Vulturu Kartal
Transylvania Erdel, Erdil, Ürdül, Transilvanya, Erdelistan
Alba Iulia Erdel Belgradı, Karlsburg, Veysenburg
Almaș Almaş
Arad Arad, Arat
Arieș River Aranoş
Baia Mare Banya, Nagbanya, Büyük Banya, Nagibanya, Nekban, Nekban Ejder, Nekban Ezder, Nagban Ejder
Batăr Fekete Bator, Fektebatur
Beclean Betlenvar
Beiuș Belnoş
Biertan Bertan
Biharia Buhar
Bihor Bihar
Bistrița Besterce, Bistiriçse, Bistirçse
Bologa Sebeş Uyvar, Şebeş Uyvar, Şebeş Uğvar
Bran Castle Bran Kalesi, Törçvar
Brasov Braşov, Barasu, Braşova, Bozsu, Baraşo, Braso, Praşo
Breadfield Ekmek Otlağı, Ekmek Otlak
Câlnic Kelnek
Câmpia Turzii Aranyuşciriş
Carei Karolvar, Karol
Cața Kaçavar
Cetatea Colț Kolçvar, Kolçovar
Cetatea de Baltă Kokullu, Kokul
Cernești Çernes
Chiuzbaia Kespenye
Cluj Kaloş, Koloş
Cluj-Napoca Kaloşvar, Koloşvar, Kolojvar
Conop Kalnup
Crişana Kiriş Bölgesi, Kirşan
Csík Çik, Çit
Cugir Kuçir
Dej Dezvaroş
Deva Deve, Devevar
Dezna Desne
Făgăraş Fogaraş, Fagaraş, Foğraş
Felnac Felnek, Felnak, Fenlak
Gilău Kalu
Gherla Samoş Uyvar, Samoş Oyvar, Oyvar, Şamos Uyvar
Gurghiu Gürgen, Görgen, Gergin
Hațeg Hatsek, Hasek
Hunedoara Hünyadi
Iernut Radnot, Ravnot
Ineu Yanova, Yenova
Iron Gates Demirkapı, Demürkapu, Portaferra
Lipova Lipova, Lipva, Lipve, Libhova
Livada Şarköz, Sarkoz
Macea Maça
Maramureş Maramaroş, Marmaroş
Mediaș Mekişvar, Mekeşvar, Megeşvar, Medise
Medieșu Aurit Aranoş Megeşvar, Aranyuş Mekeşvar, Aranyoş Mekeşvar
Miercurea Ciuc Sekelhisarı, Çik, Çit
Mihai Viteazu Senmiha
Mureș River Maroş Nehri, Mureş, Muriş
Odorheiu Secuiesc Udvarhel, Sekel Udvarheli, Sekelmeydanı
Oradea Varat, Varad, Gradovarad
Orăștie Sazvaroş, Sarvaroş
Pâncota Pankota
Petroşani Petroşan
Pomezeu Pammez
Radna Radna
Remetea Chioarului Köyvar
Rupea Kohalom
Săcueni Sengevi, Sikelhid, Sekelhid, Sikelhit, Segel Hit, Sigel Hit, Sekel Het, Seykelhit, Sekelhitvar, Sekelhit, Senkövi, Silkehit
Salonta Salanta, Salonta
Sâniob Şenköy, Senkobi, Senkub, Sekboy, Senkuy, Senköy
Sânmartin Senmartin
Sălaj Zilaş
Satu Mare Satmar, Sekmar, Setmar, Sakmar, Sahmar, Sokmar
Sebeș Saçsebeş, Saçşebeş, Sebeş, Şebeş, Mugenbah, Çebes
Șelimbăr Şelimbar, Selimbar, Selenberk, Şelenberk
Șercaia Saruhan
Sibiu Sibin, Hermanştad, Sibiv, Zibin, Çeben, Zeben, Sebin, Hermenştad, Zeybin, Seben
Siculeni Madefalva
Sighişoara Segeşvar, Segisvar
Șimand Samon
Șinteu İşlenkür
Şiria Vilagoş
Șoimeni İşlenköy
Şoimoş Şolmoş, Şolmuş
Someş River Samoş, Samos
Székely Land Sekelistan, Seykelistan
Țara Bârsei Barasistan
Târgu Mureș Targul, Tirgul, Maroşpazarı, Vaşerhal, Marostorda, Maroştorda
Târnava River Kokul, Kokol, Kokulu
Tauț Totinç
Topliţa Topliça
Turda Torda, Torde
Tureni Turen, Tordatur
Turulung Trepeşvar
Turnu Roşu Pass Kızılkule Geçidi
Valea Chioarului Kovar
Vărădia de Mureş Varadya, Varadiye
Vințu de Jos Aşağı Vinçazvar
Vintu de Sus Yukarı Vinçazvar
Zalău Zile, Silah
Zărnești Zerneşt
Wallachia Eflak, Valahya, Ulahya, Ulahiye, Vallaçya, Valahiya, Efilah
Argeș County Arciş Sancağı, Erciş
Argeș River Arciş Nehri, Argeş, Erciş, Argil
Beceni Becene
Borcea Kokarca
Brăila İbrail, Berâil
Bucharest Bükreş, Ebu-Kureyş
Buzău Boze, Buza, Boca, Bozav, Boza, Bozo, Buzu
Calafat Kalafat
Călăraşi Kılıraş, Kılışenir
Călugăreni Kalugeran, Uzun, Uzunu
Câmpulung Uzunköy
Caracal Karakale, Karagal
Cetate Çatana
Cerneți, Mehedinți Çerniç, Çerenç
Cetate Çatana
Chiscani Şerbanu
Corabia Korab
Craiova Krayova, Karayova
Dâmbovița Demboviçe, Dembovitze, Dembuçe
Drobeta-Turnu Severin Söreyn, Severin, Siverin, Turnu Severin
Gherghița Geregiçse, Gergeç, Kergeç, Gürgeç
Giurgiu Yergöğü, Yerköyü, Yerköy, Curcu, Yergöği, Yergöy, Curcura, Curcüra, Cürcüra
Ialomița Yalomiça, Balomiçe, Balumciye
Iezeru Beylik
Ilfov County Aylifo, İlfova, İlfov
Mizil Menzil
Moreni Moğlan
Mușcel Muşcel, Muşcil
Ocnele Mari Hokna
Olt Oltu, Olet
Olteniţa Olteniç, Oltenica, Oltaniçe
Pitești Pişt, Arciş, Erciş
Prahova Berehova, Berahova, Brahova, Rahova
Prahova Valley Berehova Vadisi, Berahova Vadisi
Râmnicu Sărat Rimnik, Remnik, Remlik, Rimlik
Romanați County Remaniç, Romanış, Ramenk, Romanç, Romaniş, Romaniç
Săcueni, Dâmbovița Sukuyan, Sakyon
Slobozia İslabozi
Târgoviște Tirkoviş, Terkoviç, Tirgovişte
Târgu Jiu Tirgozi, Tirguzi
Teleorman Deliorman, Telli Orman
Turnu Măgurele Kule, Kulle, Holavnik, Holovnik
Ulmeni Tavşanca
Vlașca Vilaşka, Vılaşka, Valakşar
Zimnicea Zimniçe
Carpathian Mountains Karpat Dağları, Üç Uli, Üç Oğul

Russia
Akhtuba River Aktepe Irmağı
Akhtubinsk Aktuba, Aktepe
Aksay Akçay
Arpachin Arpacı
Arzamas Arzamas
Ashuluk Aşılık
Astrahan Hacı Tarhan, Hacıtarhan, Ejderhan, Hacıtarkan, Haşterhan, Astırhan, Esterhan
Atil İtil, İdil, Etil
Atkarsk İtkara, Etkara
Azov Azak, Tane, Zane, Kal'a-i Açu
Balakhna Balahanı, Balahane, Balakan
Balakovo Balakav Yurt
Barents Sea Gök Deniz
Bataysk Batu Han, Bataysu
Belaya River (Kama) Akidil, Akidel
Belinsky Çembar, Çember, Çıngar
Belgorod Çallı Kale
Bobrov Bityuk Yurt
Bryansk Birinçi
Bystraya Sosna River Saz-İdil
Chaltyr Çaltır, Çıldır
Cheboksary Şupaşkar, Çeboksarı, Çubuksaray, Çabaksar, Sibosar, Veda Suvar, Veda-Suar
Cherdyn Çerdin
Chusovaya River Yüz Uba, Coz Uba
Cumania Deşt-i Kıpçak, Heyhat Sahrâsı, Kumanya, Kıpçak Eli
Dimitrovgrad Melekes, Melkes
Don River Tun, Buzan, Şir, Sir, Ten
Engels Bakır
Galich Galiç
Glazov Kala, Kale, Glaz, Glazkar, Singurt
Gorbatov Mişer, Mişar, Meşer
Gorodovikovsk Başanta
Izhevsk İşkar
Kalach-na-Donu Kalaç
Kalininsk Balanda
Kaluga Kalga, Hologa
Kama River Çulman, Çolman
Kamenka Kaminka
Kamyshla Kamışlı, Kamış-Samar
Kanash Kaynaş, Şahran
Kara Sea Kara Denizi, Hara, Kar Denizi
Kashary Kaşar
Kashira Kaşir
Kasimov Hankirman, Kasım, Mişer Şehir
Kharabali Karabaylı, Harabalı, Harabali, Harabelik
Kilmez Gelmez
Kingisepp Yam Kale, Yama
Kirov Kolya, Kılın, Hılın, Kolın, Kolin, Nukrat, Nokrat
Klyazma River Nokrat, Nukrat, Gülasma
Korotoyak Karatayak
Kostroma Kuş Urma, Kosturma
Kotelnich Karaşar
Kozmodemyansk Çıkma, Çıkmatala, Çikmetala
Krasivaya Mecha River Kara Muşa
Kulikovo Field Kuluk Çölü
Kursk Kür, Hursa, Hursal, Kursa, Khursa
Lake Elton Altın Göl
Lebedyan Lebed, Kuğu
Lipetsk Borın, Borın İneş, Yavçi, Yauchy
Lyskovo Sundovit, Laçık, Alaçık
Manych River Manıç ırmağı
Mariinsky Posad Sundır
Moskva River Yavaş İdil
Moscow Moskova, Moskof, Muska, Mosko, Moskha, Maskov, Moskov
Murom Kan Kerman, Kan Mardan, Kan
Narovchat Mukşa, Mokşa, Mohşi, Nurican
Neglinnaya River Ulen-Su
Nerl River Nerle-Su
Nizhny Novgorod Çulkale, Taşkale, İkerman, Cun Kale, Cunne Kale (Yeni Kale), Djunne-Kala, Cunu, İbrahim Balık, Tüben Novgorod, Bryahimov
Novaya Usman, Voronezh Oblast Yeni Osman
Novaya Zemlya Yeni Yer
Novosil İtil, İdil
Oka River Uka, Oka, Aka
Okhotsk Oşok
Orenburg Kargalı, Kargaly, Irımbur, Irınbur, Orunburg, Örenkale, Örenburg
Oryol Oryol, Orlik, Orel, Ayrel
Pechora River Biysu
Penza Kipenza 
Perm Bürühan, Börühan
Rostov Cir, Yir, Djir, Dir
Rostov-on-Don Temirnik
Ruzayevka Urazay, Uraz
Ryazan Rezen, Erzyan, Kisan, Erzan, Kısan
Saint Petersburg Sen Petersburg, Petersburg, Peterburg, Petreburg, Petreburk, Petreburug, Petrograd, Petari, Peterburi
Salsk Sal
Samara Samar, Semer, Samur, Şamar, Şamara, Samarak, Sumeru
Saqsin Sakşın, Sarışın, Sarı Şehir, Sarışehir, Saksin, Sakçı, Saksin-Bulgar, Sakçı-Bulgar, Saksin-Bolgar
Sarai Saray Batu, Murtaza Han
Saraktash Sarıtaş, Sarıktaş
Sarai, Ryazan Oblast Saray
Saransk Saran, Saranka, Saran Oş
Sarapul Sarıpul
Saratov Sarıdağ, Sarıtau, Sarı-Tav, Saritav
Sarkel Sarkel, Şarkil, Hin Kerman, Hin
Sarov Sarıkılıç
Sasovo, Ryazan Oblast Saz
Sergach Sergaç
Sevsk, Bryansk Oblast Sev, Suv
Shatsk Şaça
Smolensk Şamlın, Shamlyn
Sol-Iletsk İlek
Starocherkasskaya Çerkez Kerman
Stary Oskol Eski Uskol, Eski Usgöl
Sudzha, Kursk Oblast Suca
Sviyaga River Züye, Zöye
Syzran Suz-Urını, Sızran, Sızan
Taganrog Taygan, Takan, Togan, Doğan, Tiganak, Tiginak
Tambov Tomba
Tarkhany Tarhan
Temnikov Temnik
Totskoye Tok, Tokköy
Tsarev Saray Berke
Tula Tol, Tolu, Tolay
Ufa Ufa, Öfe, Öfö, İmen Kale
Ufa River Kara İdil
Ukek Ükek, Üvek, Ugek, Uvek, Ukek
Ulyanovsk Sinbir, Simbir, Sember, Çember, Çemper
Vaygach Island Bayagaç
Veliky Ustyug Cuketun
Vetluga Batlık, Yur
Vetluga River Batlık
Vladimir Bulımer, Bulymer, Bulimer
Volga İdil, İtil
Volga–Don Canal Türk Or, Türk Hendeği, Bektaş
Volgodonsk İdil-Tun, İdeltın
Volgograd Sarısu, Sarısin, Sarıtin, Sarı-Tin, Sarıçin, Sarychin
Volodarsk Sayma, Seyma, Soyma
Voronezh Kazar, Hazar
Voronezh River Borın İneş
Vyatka River Nokrat, Nukrat Su
Yadrin Yeterne, Eterne
Yamal Peninsula Camal, Yamal
Yauza River Avız-Elga
Yenotayevka Yandağ, Dağyanı
Yoshkar-Ola Yoşkar Ola, Çarla
Yug River Cuk, Yuğ
Zay River Zey
Zernograd Meçet, Mescit
Zhiguli Mountains Çakıllı, Çakıllıdağ
Zhigulyovsk Banca, Banja
North Caucasus Kuzey Kafkasya
Adagum Atakum
Adler Arıtlar, Ardlar, Arıdlar, Adler
Adyge-Khabl Adıge Hable
Adygeysk Adigekale
Aksai Yahsay
Anapa Anapa, Buğurkal, Bukurkale, Buğurkale
Andreyevo, Dagestan Enderi, Endirey
Armavir Şah Kirman, Yermelhable, Ermelkale, Yermelhabl, Yermelkale
Baksan Baskın, Baksan
Baksan River Baskın Su
Balanjar Belencer, Bülüncar, Balancar
Bataysk Batısu, Batı
Belaya River Şagvaşe
Belorechensk Aksu, Şıthale, Şithale
Bolshoy Zelenchuk River Ulu İncik
Budyonnovsk Mecara Suba, Macar Suba, Macar, Eski Macar, Karabağlı
Bugazkskiy Estuary Boğaz Gölü, Kızıltaş Boğazı
Buynaksk Temir Han Şura, Buynak
Caucasus Mountains Kafkaslar, Kafdağ, Saklandağ, Cebelü'l-Elsân, Lisan Dağları, Diller Dağı
Chebarkul Çebargöl, Çibergöl, Çıbargöl
Cherkessk Çerkez Şehir, Battalpaşa, Çerkezkale, Şerceskale
Chushka Spit Çoçka Burnu, Çoçka dili, Çuşka, Çışko, Çışkho, Koşka, Karaşka, Karşaka, Köşka, Karşıyaka
Dagomys Tığemıps
Derbent Derbent, Dar Bent, Demirkapı, Babü'l Abvab, Bab el-Abvab, Babü'l Ebvab, Timurkapı
Divnomorskoye Meyzib
Dykh-Tau Dikdağ
Dolgaya Spit Uzundil
Dombay Dommay
Dyultydag Dültidağ
Dzhangi-Tau Yenidağ
Elbrus Elbruz, Bindağ, Bengüdağ, Berzi Dağı, Küh-El-Berz, Ebu'l-Cibal
Endirey Endirey, Enderi
Erken-Shahar Erkin Şehir
Erkin-Yurt Erkin Yurt
Gelendzhik Gelincik, Gelencik, Gelençik, Hafitsey
Georgiyevsk Kumkale, Gumkale, Gum, Gumek
Golovinka Subaşı
Golovinka river Şehape, Şahe nehri
Goryachy Klyuch Psıfabe, Psıfab
Grozny Süncekale, Cevherkale, Suncakale, Sölcekale, Sunçkale, Süyünçkale, Sevinçkale
Inzhich-Chukun Küçük İncik
Izberbash İzberbaş
Karabudakhkent Karabudakkent
Karachayevsk Karaçay Şehir, Karaçaykale
Kara-Tube Kara Tepe
Kasumkent Kasımkent
Khabez Habez
Khadyzhensk Hadıcen
Khasavyurt Hasyurt, Hasova, Yarıksu
Kislovodsk Acısu, Narzan, Narsana, Nartsane, Nartsan
Kiziltashsky Estuary Kızıltaş Gölü
Kizlyar Semender, Samandar, Kızılyar, Kızlar, Kızlar Kale
Kizlyar, Mozdok Kızlarkalesi, Kızlar, Küçük Macar Yurt, Küçük Yurt, Bekiş Yurt
Kochubeyevskoye Koçubey
Koshekhabl Koşhable, Koşhabl
Koshtan-Tau Koştandağ
Kostek Köstek
Krasnaya Polyana Atkuac, Kbaada, Gubaadü, Atkuace
Krasnodar Kaleşkur, Kaleşho, Bjeduğkale, Bozodukkale, Karasu, Kaleşehve
Krasnovostochnoe Güm Doğu Kabak
Krymsk Hatuehable, Kırımköy
Kuban River Kuban, Kuba Su, Kuman, Kuba, Koban, Kupan
Kuma River Kum, Kimek
Labinsk Çetvın, Çetıvın, Çatvın, Çatyun, Çetyun, Nevruz-aul, Navruz-aul
Lake Chebarkul  Çebargöl, Çibergöl, Çıbargöl
Lazarevsk Psışuape
Loo Üçdere
Makhachkala Mahaçkale, İncikale, Ancikale
Mineralnye Vody Kumkent, Sultan Mengli Giray
Nalchik Nalçık
Nartkala Nartkale
Nevinnomyssk Arüv Kız
Novolakskoye Yarıksu
Novorossiysk Soğucak, Sucukkale, Tsemez, Semez, Psemez, Sağucak, Suğucak
Novy Karachay Yeni Karaçay, Akkale
Pervomayskoe Güm Abu Kabak
Otradnaya Bek-Murza
Phanagoria Onogurya, Fenegür, Fanagorya, Banca, Bandja
Primorsko-Akhtarsk Aktar-Baktar, Ahtar-Bahtar
Prokhladny Beş Tamak, Kaleklih
Pyatigorsk Beşdağ
Safakulevo Safgöl
Sail Rock Yelkenkaya
Sergokala Deşlahar
Shabanovskoye Şaban
Slavyansk-na-Kubani Kopil, Kopıl
Sochi Soçi, Saçe, Mamaykale
Stavropol Şetkale, Şadkale, Aşıl, Nogay Şehir, Huç, Kuç
Sunzha River Sünce, Sunca, Sölce, Süyünç, Sevinç
Taman Taman, Duman, Kale-yi Taman, Temen, Han Kale
Taman Peninsula Taman, Duman, Tamam, Ada-i Şahi, Ada-yı Şahi, Adis, Taman Adası, Temen
Tarki Tarak, Elbek
Teberda Teberdi
Temryuk Temir Yürek, Demir Yürek, Demirok, Temerek, Tarhan, Temrük, Temrek, Temrik, Temrikkirman, Termik, Demiroğlu, Demiryük, Adis, Tumnev
Temryuksky District Ada-i Şahi, Ada-yı Şahi, Adis
Tmutarakan Tamya-Tarhan, Tamiya Tarhan, Dima Tarhan, Damiya Tarhan
Tsokur Estuary Çukur Gölü
Tuzla Spit Tuzla dili
Tyrnyauz Tırnıauz, Turna Ağız, Dar Ağız, Tırnavuz, Turna Aviz
Ust-Labinsk Lebap
Vladikavkaz Terekkale, Terekbaşı, Kapkay, Kapıkaya, Bravkale
Yessentuki Esendik, Esentuğ
Yeysk Yey, Yeya
Zheleznovodsk Temirsu, Demirsu
Siberia Sibirya
Achinsk Açık Tura
Alygdzher Alıgyer, Ilıkyer, Alıgcer
Angara River Angara Nehri
Angarsk Angara
Barnaul Borangöl, Barangöl, Boranul, Baranul
Belukha Mountain Üç Sümer Dağları, Buzdağ
Biya River Beysu Nehri
Biysk Yaş Tura, Beysu
Bratsk Buryad, Buryat
Chelyabinsk Çelebi, Çelyaba, Çeleyaba, Çelebey, Çilebe
Cheremkhovo Arangata, Şeremye
Chimgi-Tura Çimgi-Tura, Çinki-Tura, Çımğı-Tora, İbak Han
Gorno-Altaysk Ulala, Oyrot Tura
Irkutsk Erkut, İrkut, Örket, Yandaş Darağa
Irtysh River İrteş, Ertiş, Erdişi
Ishim İşim, İşim Tura, İşem
Iskitim Iskitim, Aşkitim
Kemerovo Kemer, Kemerova, Kömürova
Khabarovsk Boli, Açan
Khasan Hasan
Kopeysk Çelebi Kapı, Çelebi Kopi, Tugaykul
Krasnoyarsk Kızılyar
Kurgan Kurgan
Kyzyl Kızıl, Hem-Beldır
Lake Baikal Baykal, Baygöl, Boygal
Lake Khasan Hasan Gölü
Lena River Lena Nehri, Zülge, Ulahan Yuryak, Ölyöne
Leninsk-Kuznetsky Kolçuk
Magnitogorsk Ateşdağ
Minusinsk Binsu
Narym Narım
Nefteyugansk Balık
Nikolayevsk-on-Amur Çerdak, Çardak
Novokuznetsk Aba Tura
Novosibirsk Kazgın, Kozgun
Novoyagodnoye, Znamensky District Şiş Tamak
Ob River Obi, Umar, Ümer, Yamar, Omar
Omsk Kara-Tora, Omek, Om Tura, Tın, Ombu, Ompu, Umpu, Ombı
Pur River İber
Qashliq Kaşlık, İsker, Eskiyer, Kışlak, Sibir
Sakhalin Sahalin, Doğu Saha (Saha İlin), Karafuto (Japanese)
Salekhard Abi-Tura
Slavyanka Tulamu, Brüs Limanı
Surgut Surğut, Sorğıt
Tara Tura
Taymyr Taymır
Tobol River Tubulka, Tubıl
Tobolsk Tubulka, Tubul, Tubıl, Tuba
Tomsk Tom Tura
Tumen River Tümen, Duman
Tyumen Tümen, Tümen Tura, Tömen Tura, Tömen
Usolye-Sibirskoye Dabhan
Ussuriysk Şuaybinbu
Ust-Ishim Kızıl Tura
Vladivostok Hayşenvay
Yakutsk Yakut
Yalutorovsk Yavlu Tura, Yalı Tura
Yekaterinburg Şartaş, Sarıtaş, Ketrinbur
Yenisei River Yenisey, Ulu Kem, Ulu Hem
Yuzhno-Sakhalinsk Güney Sahalin, Toyohara
Zlatoust Kosa Tur
Tatarstan Tataristan
Agryz Egerce, Agerce
Aksubayevsky Aksubay
Aktanysh Aktanış
Alkeyevsky Elki, Alki
Almetyevsk Elmet, Almat, Calmat
Apastovo Apas
Arsk Arça
Aşlı Aşlı
Atninsky Etne, Atna
Aznakayevo Aznakay
Baltasi Baltaç
Bavly Bavlı
Bilär Biler, Büler, Bilyar, Bulyar
Bolghar Bulgar, Bolgar
Bolshoy Cheremshan River Ulu Çirmeşen
Bugulma Bügülme, Bögelma
Buinsk Bua
Chatyr-Tau Çadırdağ
Cheremshansky Çirmeşen, Çirmeşan
Chistopol Çistay, Tukçi
Karabash Karabaş
Kazan Kazan, Üçel, Uchel, Oşel, Oshel, Beş-Balta, Bish-Balta
Kazan Kremlin Kazan Kirman, Bogıldağ
Laishevo Layış
Leninogorsk Peçmen, Pesmen
Maly Cheremshan River Küçük Çirmeşen, Bula İdil
Mamadysh Mamadış
Menzelinsk Minzele, Minzala
Naberezhnye Chelny Yar Çallı, Çallı
Nizhnekamsk Tüben Kama, Tübenkama
Nurlat Nurlat, Norlat
Pestrechinsky Pitreç, Çuar
Sheshma River Çeşme
Suar Nur-Suvar, Suvar, Barıncar, Şam-Suvar, Barıntu
Sviyaga River Zöye, Deber Su, Zuya
Sviyazhsk Zöye, Dağ Kerman
Tetyushi Teteş, Tetüş
Yelabuga Alabuğa, Alaboğa
Zainsk Zey, Zay
Zelenodolsk Yeşil Üzen

Saudi Arabia
Abha Ebha
Abu `Arish Ehariş, Ebu Ariş
Bad' El Bid, Medyen
Badr Bedir
Dammam Dahran, Dammam
Diriyah Diriye, Deriye
Duba Zibâ
Hasa Lahza, Lahsa
Hejaz Hicaz
Hofuf Hüfuf, Hofuf, Lahsa, Hassa, El Hasa, El Lahsa
Jeddah Cidde
Jizan Cizan, Cazan
Jurash Cüreş
Khaybar Hayber
Khobar Huber, El Huber
Mada'in Saleh Medain Salih, Medayin-i Salih, El Hicr
Makna Makna, Magna
Mecca Mekke, Mekke-i Mükkereme, Mekke-i Muazzama
Ajyad Ecyad
Ajyad Fortress Ecyad Kalesi
Aziziyah Aziziye
Black Stone Hacer el-Esved, Hacerü'l-Esved, Hacerü'l-Esvad, Siyah Taş
Cave of Hira Hira Mağarası
Jabal al-Nour Nur Dağı, Işık Dağı
Jabal Thawr Sevr Dağı, Boğa Dağı
Jamaraat Bridge Cemerat Köprüsü, Şeytan Taşlama Köprüsü
Kaaba Kâbe
Mahbas Eljen, Aziziyah Mahbes'ül Cin
Masjid al-Haram Mescid-i Haram
Mina Mina
Misfalah Mesfele
Mount Arafat Arafat Dağı
Muzdalifah Müzdelife
Zamzam Well Zemzem Kuyusu, Hemze, Tayyibe, Tahire, Şarabü'l-Ebbar
Medina Medine, Medine-i Münevvere, Medinet'ül Münevvere, Yesrib
Al-Masjid al-Nabawi Mescid-i Nebevî, Peygamber Camii
Mount Uhud Uhud
Muwaylih (Almuwaylih) Müveylah, Müveyla
Najd Necid, Necit
Najran Necran
Ozlam (Alozlam) Ezlem
Qatif Katif
Qunfudhah Kunfüze, Kunfuda
Rabigh Rabiğ, Rebiğ, Rabih
Red Sea Kızıldeniz, Bahr-i Ahmer, Bahrü'l-Kulzüm, Bahr-i Kulzüm, Bahr-i Hicaz, Şap Denizi, Bahr-i Kurzüm, Bahr-i Süveyş
Riyadh Riyad
Suwayriqiyah Sevârikih
Tabuk Tebük, Eyke
Taif Taif
Tayma Teyma
Tihamah Tihame
Umm Lajj Emlac
Ula El Ula, Alâ
Wajh El Vecih, El Vech
Yanbu Yenbû, Yenbe'ül-Bahr

Serbia
Aleksinac Aleksanca, Aleksince, Aleksince Palankası
Avala Havale
Batočina Batiçsa, Baticsa
Bela Palanka Mustafapaşapalanka, Mustafapaşahisar, Musapaşa, Musa Paşa Kalesi
Belgrade Belgrad, Belgrat, Yunusakhisar, Yunusbelgrat, Belgrad-ı Ungurus, Belgrat-ı Üngürüs, Belgrad-ı Engürüs, Fikir Tepe, Bab'ül Hurub, Dârü'l-Cihad, Belgrad-ı Tuna, Belgrat-ı Bûnyâd, Sengin-Bünyad
Ada Ciganlija Çingene Ada
Bajrakli Mosque, Belgrade Bayraklı Cami, Çuhacı Cami, Hüseyin Bey Cami, Çuhacı Hüseyin Cami
Bulbulder Bülbüldere
Čemerno Çemerne
Čubura Çubura
Dorćol Dörtyol
Great War Island Büyük Savaş Adası, Yukarı Ostere
Kalemegdan Kalemeydan
Karaburma Karaburma, Kayaburun
Little War Island Küçük Savaş Adası, Aşağı Ostere, At Adası, Beygir Adası
Makiš Mahiş
Republic Square (Belgrade) İstanbul Kapı
Skadarlija İşkodralı
Tašmajdan Taşmeydan
Terazije Teraziye, Teraziler
Bovan Bolvan
Brusnica Burusniça
Čačak Caçka, Çaçka
Ćićevac Yunis, Yunus
Čubura Çubura
Ćuprija Köpri, Köprü
Dimitrovgrad İsnebol, İznebol
Golubac Güğercinlik, Kolombaç, Galamboç, Güvercinlik, Golupça
Golubinje Göğercinlik
Grocka Hisarcık, Hisarlık, Kruçka
Ivanjica İvaniçe
Ivankovac İvankofça
Jagodina Yagodina, Yagodine
Karaš River Karasu
Kladovo Kladova, Yenişehir, Fetislam, Feth-ül İslam, Fethülislam, Gladova
Ključ Klüç, Kulica
Knjaževac Gurgusofça
Kolari Kolorine Palankası
Kragujevac Karacofça, Kraguyevaç
Kraljevo Karanofça
Kruševac Alacahisar, Kruşevca
Kučajna Kütçayna, Kuçayna
Kučevo Kuçeva
Kuršumlija Kurşunli, Kurşunlu, Kurşunlu Kilise
Leskovac Leskofça, Leskofçe
Hisar Hill Hisar Tepesi
Majdanpek Madeniipek
Mali Bošnjak Küçük Boşnak, Bosniyak
Mikuljana Yeniköy
Niš Niş
Ostrvica Fortress Sivrice Hisar
Paraćin Peraken, Perakin, Parakin, Praken, Paraken Palankası
Pirot Şehirköy, Şarköy
Požarevac Pasarofça, Posorofça, Pojorofça
Požega Pozgacık, Pojegacık
Prokuplje Ürgüb, Ürgüp, Okrub
Radujevac Raduyofça
Ram Haram
Raška Raşka
Ražanj Racanya, Rajanya Palankası
Rudnik Rudnik
Šabac Böğürdelen, Bügürdelen, Büğürdelen, Büyürdelen, Böğürtlen
Smederevo Semendire, Semendere, Şemendire
Smederevska Palanka Hasanpaşapalanka, Vezirhasanpaşa
Sokobanja Bana
Svilajnac İsvilaniçe
Svrljig Esferlik, İsferlik
Subotica Sobotka, Soboska, Soboşka
Timok Timak
Titel Tetil
Tvrdići Tordiki
Uvac Voça
Užice Öziçe, Uziçe, Uziçse, Öziçse
Valjevo Valva, Valeva, Valyeva
Vranje İvranya, İvranye
Zaječar Saticar
Zemun Zemlin, Zemun, Zemin, Zemun, Zemon, Mermon
Preševo Valley Preşova Vadisi
Biljača Bilaç
Bujanovac Buyanofça
Medveđa Medvece
Preševo Preşova, Preşuva
Žbevac Zibefçe
Sandžak Sancak, Yeni Pazar Sancağı
Banjsko Brdo Bençse
Hisardžik Hisarcık
Javor Yavor İskelesi, Çit Kapısı
Jeliće Yeleç, Yalance
Mileševo Mileşova, Mileşeva, Miloşove
Nova Varoš Yenivaroş
Novi Pazar Yenipazar
Pavlje Pavli
Priboj Priboy, Pirboy, Sırboy
Prijepolje Pirepol, Pirebol, Pirepolye, Prepol, Semi Pazar
Sebečevo Cebinhan
Sjenica Seniçe, Zenice
Tutin Tutin
Vojvodina Voyvodina
Alibunar Alipınar
Bač Baç
Bačka Baçka
Bačka Palanka Küçük Hisar
Bački Petrovac Petrofçe
Banatska Palanka Haram, Haram-ı Cedid
Banoštor Banuşdora, Banoştra
Barič Bariç
Bečej Beçe, Beçey
Bela Crkva Aktabya, Akkilise
Borča Barça, Berçe, Borca
Čerević Çerevit, Çereviç, Kerevit
Čoka Çoka
Deliblato Delibalta
Futog Futak, Futok
Grgurevci Girgurofça, Gırgurefçe
Hrtkovci Kırakopofçe, Kıragopofçe
Ilandža Yılanca
Irig İrek, İrig, İrik
Jabuka Yabuka, Pabuka
Jarak Yarka, Yarak, Yarık
Kovilj Kobila
Kula Kule
Kupinovo Kupinik
Lokve Semihal
Margita Margita
Martonoš Martonoş
Morović Morovit, Moroviç, Morovik
Mošorin Moşorin
Novi Kneževac Yeni Kanije, Türk Kanije
Novi Sad Raçka Varoş, Uyvidek, Üyvidek
Pančevo Pançova, Bançova, Panç Ova
Petrovaradin Varadin, Petervarad, Petervaradin
Senta Zenta, Senta
Sombor Sonbor, Sambor, Zombor, Zonbor, Sombor
Srbobran Sentomaş
Sremska Mitrovica Dimitrofça, Mitroviçe, Metrofça, Dimitrofçe, Dimitroviçe, Mitroviçse, Metroviçse, Mitrofçe
Sremska Rača Raçe, Raça
Sremski Karlovci Karlofça, Karloviç, Karloviçe
Stari Slankamen İslankamen, İslankemen, Islankamen, Salankamen, İslankoman
Subotica Sobotka, Sobotka-i Segedin
Syrmia Sirem, Siremiyye, Sirmya
Titel Dörtel, Pil
Vrbas Virbaza, Verbas
Vršac Verşe, Şemlik, Verseç, Virşaç
Žabalj Zebliye
Zrenjanin Beçkerek, Beşkelek, Beşkerek, Beştelek, Beşlek

Slovakia
Bačka Baçka
Banská Bystrica Besterce Ban'a, Besterce Banya
Banská Štiavnica Şelmec Ban'a, Şelmeç Banya
Boťany Bak'an, Bak'an Parkanı
Bratislava Bratislava, Bozon, Pojon, Pojun, Pizon
Bzovík Bozok
Divín Divin
Dolné Obdokovce Bodok
Dunajská Streda Tuna Serdahel
Fiľakovo Filek, Fülek
Hajnáčka Aynaçka, Oynak, Hayasko
Halič Haliç, Gaç
Hlohovec Holok, Galgofça, Golgofça
Hostie Hıroşo
Hostišovce Gestöş, Gesteş
Hron Gran Nehri, Gara, Garam
Hronský Beňadik Sentbenedek
Ipeľ Ipol nehri
Jelenec Gimöş, Gimös
Jelšava Yoşva
Kremnica Karmusbane
Kamenec pod Vtáčnikom Kameneç, Kemeneç
Kežmarok Kesmark
Komárno Komran, Komaran, Kumran, Komaron
Komjatice Gradişka, Komyat, Komyatin
Košice Kaşa, Kaşe, Kaşav, Kaşevar
Levice Leva, Leve, Love
Levoča Löçe
Lopúchov Laboş
Lučenec Luçenice, Lusunca, Lüsünce, Luçeniça
Marcelová Marçaze, Marchaze
Modrý Kameň Kekköy, Keköy, Kekko, Kekkö, Gökkaya
Nyárhíd Narhid
Nitra Litra, Elitri, Nitre, Litre, Nitram, Nitra
Nitrianska Streda Nitra Serdahel
Nové Zámky Uyvar, Üyvar, Ersekuyvar
Olováry Ovar
Orava Castle Arva Kalesi
Palota Polata
Pezinok Bazin
Plášťovce Palast
Preseľany Pereslin
Prešov Eperyes
Pukanec Bukabak, Bobak
Rimavská Sobota Rimsonbot, Rimsonbat, Rima Sonbot
Rožňava Rojna
Šahy Şefradi, Şifredi, Ság, Şay
Šaľa Şala, Şele, Selle, Sele
Šaštín-Stráže Şaşvar
Sebechleby Sebelib
Senica Senice
Šintava Şente, Sente
Sobôtka Sobotka, Sobotuşka
Sokolniky Salakuz
Sotina Sotin, Satın
Spiš Sepeş
Štítnik Çetnek
Štúrovo Ciğerdelen, Parkan
Šurany Şuran
Svodín Södin
Tekov Barş
Tekovské Lužany Şarlofça, Şarlo
Tisovec Tisofça, Tisolca
Topoľčany Nagtopoçan, Nagtoboçin
Topoľčianky Kiştopoçan, Kiştoboçin
Trenčín Trençin,  Butaş
Trhovište Vaşarheld
Trnava Tırnava
Tvrdošín Tırdoşin
Veľké Vozokany Bazakan
Žabokreky Zabokrek, Jabokrek
Žibritov Jibritofça
Žitava (river) Jitva
Žitavská Tôňa Zitvatorok, Zitvatoruk, Jitvatorok
Zlaté Moravce Morova, Altunmorova
Zvolen Zolyom

Slovenia
Beltinci Balatin
Carinthia Karintiya, Karantanya, Karanite, Karenti
Carniola Karinyola, Karniyola, Karniyol, Karinya, Karinova
Celje Silli
Izola İzle
Koper Deştirye
Ljubljana Laybah, Lübyana
Maribor Marburg
Novo Mesto Rudolfsvert, Nevstadtel, Nevstad
Piran Perano
Ptuj Petava, Petta, Poton
Windic March Vender Markıya

Somalia
Maydh Mete
Mogadishu Muğdiş, Muğtiş, Mukdişu, Makdişu, Makadişu, Mogadişu
Zeila Zeyla

South Africa

South Korea
Busan Pusan
Incheon İnçon
Seoul Seul

Spain
A Coruña Kürünne
Álava Elbe
Albacete Basit, El-Basit, El-Basıt
Albalá Medinet'ül Beled
Albarracin Beni Resin, Abin Resin, Aben Razin, Şentemeriye, Şentemeriyyetüşşark, Şentemeriyyetü' Şark
Albuixech Abu İshak
Alcañiz Kenayis, Hisnü'l Kenayis
Alcantud Kentüd, El Kentüd
Alcaudete Kibdet
Alcázar de San Juan Kasr-ül Atiyye
Algeciras Ceziretü'l Hadra
Alicante Alikante, Likant, Elkant, Alakant, Lakant, Alikant
Almadén El Maden, Medinetü Maden
Almanzora Mansuriyye
Almeria Almeria, Elmeriyye, Meriye, El Meriye
Almodóvar del Río Müdavver ül-Adna
Alovera Hüveyre
Alpujarras Büşşerat, Beşerat, Büşşere
Alzira Ceziretü' Şükür
Andalusia Endülüs 
Andújar Endücer
Antequera Entakire
Aragon Aragon, Ergun
Arcos de la Frontera Erkuş, Erküş
Ardales Erzullah
Arjona Ercune
Atarfe El Taraf
Aznalcázar Hisn-ül Kasır
Azuqueca de Henares Zükeyke, Beledü' Zükeyke
Badajoz Batalyos, Batalyevs, Beytü'l Yevz
Baeza Beyyase
Balearic Islands Baler Adaları
Barcelona Barselona, Berşelune, Berselune
Barrameda Bahrü'l Medâ, Salukka
Bay of Biscay Biskay Körfezi, Halicü' Beskaye, el Bahr'ul Ahdar
Benahadux Bayyana
Benaguasil Beni Vezil, İbnü'l Vezil
Benalmádena Beniyü'l Medine, Ibnü'l Medine, İbn'ül Maden
Bilbao Bilbao, Bilbav, Bilbo
Burgos Bürşiye
Bujalance Burç ül-Henis
Burjassot Burç üz-Zut
Cabra Kabra, Kebre
Cáceres Kasareş, Kanreş, Kasrü'l Azad
Cádiz Kadis, Kadiz, Medinetü'l Kadis
Calamocha Kaletü'l Musa, Kalemusa
Calatañazor Kaletü'l Nusür
Calatayud Kaletü'l Eyüp
Calatrava la Vieja Kaletü'l Rebbe, Kalat-ü Rebâh, Kal'atur-Ruba
Canary Islands Kanarya Adaları, Kanarye
El Hierro Fero
Fuerteventura Ventore
Gran Canaria Kanarye
La Gomera Gomara
La Palma Palme
Lanzarote Lenserto
Tenerife Elferno
Cañete Kenit
Cantabria Kantebriye
Carmona Kermüne, Karmuna, Karmune
Cartagena Kartaçine, Kartacennetü'l Halfa
Cartaya Kaştem
Casares Sas
Castellar de la Frontera Ruhiye, Erruh, Hisnü'l Levre
Castillo de Locubín Ükbin
Catalonia Katalonya, Gedelanya
Ceuta Septe, Sebte
Cieza Medina Siyâsa
Ciudad Real Maslaha, Meslehe
Córdoba Kordoba, Kurtuba
Covadonga Zahrayü'l Bilay, Zahrayibilay
Cuenca Künka, Künga
Dénia Daniye
Écija İstice, Isihşe, Medinetü'l Koton, İsticce
Estepona Estebunne, İstibunne
Fuengirola Süheyl
Fresno Alhándiga El-Hendek
Galicia Galisya, Cillîkıye
Genalguacil Cennet-ü Vezir
Generalife Cennetü'l Arif
Genil River Sincil, Şenil
Getafe Cadafi
Gibraleón Jebel'ül Uyum
Girona Cüründe
Gormaz Görmez
Granada Granada, Gırnata, Kıranata, Kunata
Grazalema Beni Selim
Guadalajara Vadiyü'l Hicret, Vadi'ül-Hicâre
Guadalquivir River Vadiyü'l Kebir, Vadi el-Kebir, Nehri Azam, Nehri Kurtuba, Beyti, Batika
Guadarrama Vadi'ür-Remle
Guadalete River Vâdî Lekkü, Lekke, Bekke
Guadix Vadiaşi, Vadi Aşi
Henares Nehir
Huelma Velme
Huelva Velbe, Üvenbe, Evnebe
Huesca Veşga
Iberia İberya, İbâriye
Ibiza  İbiza, Yabisa, Yabise, Yabse, Yabis, Bizans, Pervise, Yaviza, Payise, Pevise
Iniesta Yanasta, Yeneste
Isla de Las Palomas Tarif Adaları, Ceziret-ü Tarif, Ceziret-i Tarif, Güvercin Adaları
Jaén Ceyyan
Jerez de la Frontera Yerez, Şeriş, Şeriş Ferentire
Jimena de la Frontera Şemne, Şemine
Jódar Zevder, Sevder
La Guardia de Jaén Mentise, Vedi Abdullah
La Mancha Mança
Lebrija Levrişe, Lebrişe
León Leon, Liyun
Llívia Medinet'ül Bab
Loja Levşe, Lavşe
Lorca Lurka, Levreke
Los Baños Hamme, el Hame, Alhama
Lucena Yusane, Yüsane, Yüsene
Madrid Madrid, Mecrit
Mahón Mahon
Majorca Mayorka, Meyurka, Mayarko
Málaga Malaga, Malega, Mâleka
Maracena Marakena, Merşane, Mersane, Mürsane
Marbella Marbeya, Merbelle
Marchena Merşene
Medina Azahara Medinet'ü Zahra
Medina Elvira İlbire
Medinaceli Medinet'ü Selim, Medinet Salim
Medina-Sidonia Şedune, Şaduna, Şezûne, Şedünya
Melilla Meliya, Meliye, Melile
Mérida Mérida, Maride
Mértola Mertola, Mertüle
Menorca Minorka, Menurka, Menarko, Manarko
Morón de la Frontera Mevrur
Murcia Mürsiye
Nájera Nacere, Necre
Navarre Navarra, Neberre, Nabarre, Biladü'l Beşkens, Beled-i Beşkens, Beşkünye, Nebre, Navar
Niebla Leble
Ojén Hüseyin, Hüseyn
Osuna Usüne
Palma de Mallorca Palma, Balme
Parades Pardiş
Pamplona Pamplona, Benbelune, Benbülune
Pechina Beccane
Peñón de Vélez de la Gomera Velez Kayalığı, Kumayra, Badis
Purchena Hisn'ül Bürşene
Pyrenees Pireneler, Bürt, el Bürtat
Quesada Keyşete
Requena Ruhane
Ronda Ronda, Runde, Hisn'ü Runde, Hisn ür-Runde
Sagrajas Seleke
Salamanca Salamanka, Şelemenka
San Esteban de Gormaz Şent İştebin de Gurmac, Gurmac
Santander Santander, Şentemeriye
Santiago de Compostela Şent Yakub el Mukaddese, Sen Yakubü'l Mukaddese
Segovia Şikubiye
Seville Seviya, Sevil, Sebilye, İşbilye, İşbiliye, İşbilge, İşbirya
Sierra de Javalambre Cebel-ü Emir
Talavera de la Reina Talavera, Talebeyre, Talibeyre, Dalavere
Tarifa Tarif
Tarragona Tarrakûne
Tejada Telyete, Telyata
Teruel Tirvil
Tocina Tüşene, Tuşana
Toledo Toledo, Tuleytule, Tuleytula, Tüleytüle
Tortosa Turtuş, Turtüşe, Tartuşa
Torrox Turuş
Trafalgar Tarifü'l Garp
Trigueros Teküne, Takuna
Trujillo Türcele
Tudela Tudela, Tutile, Tütile
Turia Valley Vediyü'l Ebyaz
Úbeda Übeyde, Übeydü'l Arab
Uclés Üklis, Uklis, Ukliş
Valencia Valensiya, Belensiye, Velense
Valladolid Valladolid, Beledü'l Velid, Vadi İbnü'l Velid, Belde-i Velid, Beldevelit
Vélez-Málaga Belleş, Belliş
Villaviciosa Vila-Viskoza
Zaragoza Zaragoza, Sarakusta, Saragoza
Zamora Semure, Semüre, Samura, Semmure

Sudan

Sweden

Switzerland

Syria
Aleppo Governorate Halep İli
Afrin District Afrin İlçesi
Afrin Subdistrict Afrin Beldesi
Afrin Afrin
Bulbul Subdistrict Bülbül Beldesi
Bulbul Bülbül
Jindires Subdistrict Cinderesi Beldesi
Celemê Çeleme
Jindires Cinderesi, Cinderisi, Cindires, Cendires, Cenderus, Cinderes, Cindere
Kurd Mountains Kurt Dağı, Kürt Dağı, Halep Dağı
Maabatli Subdistrict Maabatlı Beldesi
Maabatli Maabatlı, Mabatlı, Muarrata
Mount Barsa Burseya Dağı
Rajo Subdistrict Reco Beldesi
Meidan Ekbis Meydan Ekbez, Meydan-ı Ekbez
Rajo Reco, Raco
Sharran Subdistrict Şeran Beldesi
Qatma Katma, Kitme, Katime
Sharran Şeran, Şiran, Şaran, Şerran
Shaykh al-Hadid Subdistrict Şeyh Hadid Beldesi
Shaykh al-Hadid Şeyh Hadid, Şeyh el-Hadid
Atarib District Atarip İlçesi
Atarib Subdistrict Atarip Beldesi
Atarib Atarip, Atarib
Ayn al-Arab District Arap Pınar İlçesi
Ayn al-Arab Subdistrict Arap Pınar Beldesi
Arslan Tash Arslan Taş
Ashme Eşme
Tomb of Suleyman Shah Süleyman Şah Türbesi, Süleyman Şah Saygı Karakolu (exclave of Turkey)
Kobanî Arap Pınar, Arappınarı, Mürşitpınar, Ayn el-Arap, Ayn ül-Arap, Kobani
Sarrin Subdistrict Serrin Beldesi
Qara Qozaq Karakozak
Sarrin Serrin
Shuyukh Tahtani Subdistrict Şeyh Tahtani Beldesi
Shuyukh Tahtani Şeyh Tahtani, Şeyuk Tahtani
Azaz District Azez İlçesi
Akhtarin Subdistrict Ahterin Beldesi
Akhtarin Ahterin, Ahtarin, Akterin, Aktarin
Bahwartah Bahvarta
Baruza Baruze
Dabiq Dabık, Mercidabık, Merc-i Dabık
Dudyan Dudiyen
Kadrish Gidriş
Tal'ar Gharbi Tel Ar Garbi
Tal'ar Sharqi Tel Ar Şarki
Turkman Bareh Türkmenbarı
Ziadiyah Ziyadiye
Azaz Subdistrict Azaz Beldesi
Azaz Azez
Jarez Carıs, Cârız
Kafr Kalbin Kefr Kelbin, Kefer Kelbin
Kaljibrin Kulcibrin, Kelcibrin
Ma'arin Muarin
Menagh Minek, Minak
Salameh Sucu
Shamarin Şemmerin
Mare' Subdistrict Mare Beldesi
Mare' Mare, Mari
Nubl Subdistrict Nubul Beldesi
Nubl Nubul
Zahraa Zehra
Sawran Subdistrict Suran Beldesi
Baraghida Barak Atlı
Duwaybiq Toybuk, Duveybık, Dunik
Hawar Kilis Havar Kilis, Havar
Ihtaimlat Hatımillet, İhtayimlat, İhtaymilât, Hetemlat
Judaydah Yeniyapan, Yeni Yapan
Kafr Shoush Kefer Şuş
Murayghil Muraygil, Mirgele
Rael İreal, Ra'ıl
Sawran Suran, Soran
Zayzafun İğde, Zeyzefun
Tell Rifaat Subdistrict Tel Rıfat Beldesi
Kafr Naya Kefer Neye
Shaykh Issa Şeyh İsa
Tell Rifaat Tel Rıfat
Bab District El Bab İlçesi
Arima Subdistrict Arime Beldesi
Arima Arime, Orayma, Arima
Bab Subdistrict El Bab Beldesi
Bab El Bab, Bab
Bizaah Bezağa, Bizâh
Qabasin Başköy, Kıbbesin
Rai Subdistrict Çobanbey Beldesi
Ameriyeh Mazıcı, Amiriye
Buzlijah ash Sharqiyah Buzluca Şarkiye, Doğu Buzluca
Haddabat Edebet, Adabat, Hadabat, Hedebet
Haji Kusa Hacıköse
Rai Çobanbey, Çobanbeğ, Rai, Rayi
Waqf Vakıf
Tadef Subdistrict Tadif Beldesi
Tadef Tadif
Jarabulus District Cerablus İlçesi
Ghandoura Subdistrict Gavureli Beldesi
Arab Azzah Arap Aziz
Fursan Sipahiler
Ghandoura Gavureli, Gavur Elli
Lilawa Lileve
Qebbet al-Turkmen Gubut Türkmen, Kubbetü'l-Türkmen
Jarabulus Subdistrict Cerablus Beldesi
Amarnah Amarine, Amarna
Ayn al-Bayda Akpınar
Balaban Balaban, Balban
Bir Fawqani Karakuyu, Karaköy, Bir Fevkan
Bir Tahtani Kanköy, Bir Tahtani
Dabis Dabıs, Debis
Hajaliah Keklice
Haluwaniyah Elvaniye, Hilvaniye
Jamel Câmil, Cemil, Şamil
Jarabulus Cerablus
Marma al-Hajar Taştan
Qandariyah Gındırıya, Gunduriye
Tall Shair Tel Şaeir
Yusuf Bayk Yusufbey, Yusuf Bey
Manbij District Münbiç İlçesi
Abu Kahf Subdistrict Ebu Kahf Beldesi
Abu Qilqil Subdistrict Ebu Kilkil Beldesi
Abu Qilqil Ebu Kilkil, Ebu Kılkıl
Manbij Subdistrict Münbiç Beldesi
Arab Hassan Kabir Arap Hasan Kebir
Arab Hassan Saghir Arap Hasan Sağir
Buzlijah al Gharbiyah Buzluca Garbiye, Batı Buzluca
Hayyah Kabirah Hayye Kebir
Manbij Münbiç, Menbiç, Minbiç, Mabuk
Yulanli Yılanlı
Maskanah Subdistrict Meskene Beldesi
Maskanah Meskene
Barbalissos Baliz, Balis
Mount Simeon District Cebeliseman İlçesi
Aleppo Halep
Darat Izza Daret İzze
Deir Semaan Deyr Seman
Hadher El Hıdır, El Hadır
Haritan Hureytan
Mount Simeon Cebeliseman, Cebelisemaan, Cebel-i Seman
Muslimiyah Müslimiye
Qinnasrin Kınnesrin
Queiq River Kuveyk Nehri, Halep Nehri
Tell al-Daman Tel Daman
Zirbah Zirbe, Zerbe
Safira District Sefire İlçesi
Khanasir Hanesir, Hanasır
Safira Sefire, Safire
Damascus Governorate Şam İli
Damascus Şam, Dimeşk
Barzeh Berze
Midan Meydan, El Meydan, Taş Meydan
Sarouja Sarıca
Yarmouk Yermük, Yarmuk
Daraa Governorate Dera İli
Daraa District Dera İlçesi
Abtaa Bita
Bosra Busra, Busra el-Şam, Eski Şam Busrâ, Eski Şam
Daraa Dera
Ghariyah al-Gharbiyah El Gariye
Jiza El Cize
Maaraba Maraba, Ma'raba
Muzayrib Müzeyrip, Müzeyrib
Sahwah El Sehva
Tafas Tefes
Hauran Havran Platosu
Izra District Zura İlçesi
Hirak Harak, El Hirak, Hirak, Herak
Izra Zura, İzra
Nawa Neva, Navi
Shaykh Maskin Şıh Miskin, Samsakin
Sanamayn District Senemeyn İlçesi
Burraq Barak
Harra El Hara, Han
Inkhil Inhıl, Nahal
Khabab Hebeb, Hebep, Habap
Khirbet Ghazaleh Kutaybit Tamir
Deir ez-Zor Governorate Deyrizor İli
Deir ez-Zor District Deyrizor İlçesi
Abu Kamal Ebukemal, Ebu Kemal, Elbu Kemal, Kışla
Busayrah Buseyra
Deir ez-Zor Deyrizor, Deyrezor, Deyr-i Zor, Zor, Deyr, Der Zor
Mayadin District Meyadin İlçesi
Asharah Aşare, Eşare, El Aşare, Aşara
Mayadin Meyadin, Mayadin, Miyadin
Rahba Rahbe
Hama Governorate Hama İli
Hama District Hama İlçesi
Hama Subdistrict Hama Beldesi
Hama Hama
Jajiyah Caciyeh
Hirbnafsah Subdistrict Hırbınefsıh Beldesi
Aqrab Akrap, Akrab, Akrep, Kara Halil
Deir al-Fardis Dir Firdis
Hirbnafsah Hırbınefsıh
Jarjisa Circisi
Musa al-Hulah Mesel Hule
Talaf Tıllıf
Hamraa Subdistrict Elhamra Beldesi
Al-Hamraa Elhamra
Suran Subdistrict Suran Beldesi
Suran Suran
Mahardah District Muharde İlçesi
Kafr Zita Kefer Zeyta
Karnaz Kurnaz
Mahardah Muharde, Maharda, Muharda
Masyaf District Misyaf İlçesi
Awj Uc, Avc
Ayn Halaqim Ayn Halakim
Bayt Natar Beyt Nater
Hermel Hırmıl, Hermel, Harmil
Huwayr al-Turukman Huveir Türkmen
Jubb Ramlah Cub Ramle
Masyaf Misyaf, Mesyaf, Masyaf
Qurtuman Gertman, Kurtuman
Wadi al-Uyun Vadi el Uyun
Salamiyah District Selimiye İlçesi
Barri Sharqi Berri Şarki
Buwaydah Buveyde
Qablahat Kuputulhat
Sabburah Sabbure
Salamiyah Selimiye, Selemiye, Selamiye
Tell Hasan Basha Tel Hasan Paşa
Tell Sinan Tel Sinan
Tiba Elturki Tiba El Türki
Suqaylabiyah District Sukaylabiye İlçesi
Karnaz Kurnaz, Kernez
Qalaat al-Madiq Kala't el Mudik, Kala't el Madik, Mudik Kalesi, Medik Kalesi, Efemiye, Epemiye
Apamea Efemiye, Epemiye
Suqaylabiyah Sukaylabiye
Shathah Şetha, Şatha
Tell Salhab Tel Selhap
Ziyarah Ziyaret
Hasakah Governorate Haseki İli
Hasakah District Haseki İlçesi
Hasakah Haseki, Hasiçi, Haseke
Shaddadah Şeddade
Malikiyah District Deyrik İlçesi
Jawadiyah Çil Ağa, Cevadiye
Khalidiyah Hanik
Malikiyah Deyrik, Derik, Melkiye, Malikiye
Yaarubiyah Tel Koçer, Til Koçer, Tilkoçer, Yarubiye
Qamishli District Kamışlı İlçesi
Amuda Amudiye
Qahtaniyah Kabir El Bid, Tırbesipi, Tirbespi, Kahtaniye
Qamishli Kamışlı
Ras al-Ayn District Resülayn İlçesi
Darbasiyah Derbesiye, Dirbesiye
Ras al-Ayn Resülayn, Resü'l Ayn, Resulayn, Rasüleyn, Serekaniye
Homs Governorate Humus İli
Homs District Humus İlçesi
Ayn al-Niser Ayn el Niser, Aynel Niser, Aynel Nasır
Furqlus Fırıklus
Hisyah Hisye
Homs Humus
Dar al-Kabirah Dar el Kebir
Fairouzeh Feyruze
Khirbet Tin Nur Hırbit El Tine
Khirbet al-Sawda Hırbıt Sude
Marj al-Qata Gacer Garbi, Mercıl Kıt
Qazhal Kızıl, Gızhıl, Gazal, Gazel
Umm al-Qasab Umulkasab
Riqama Rikama
Dardaghan Dardağan
Shayrat Şeyrat, Şayrat
Shin Şin
Mukharram District El Mükerrem İlçesi
Al-Mukharram El Mükerrem
Qusayr District El Kuseyir İlçesi
Arjoun Arcun
Nizariyah Nizariye
Qusayr El Kuseyir, El Kuseyr
Tell al-Nabi Mando Telen-Nebi Mind
Kadesh Kadeş
Rastan District Restan İlçesi
Rastan Restan, Rastan
Gharnatah Kacer, El Kacer, Gırnata, El Gırnata
Kafr Nan Kefer Nen
Kissin Kisin
Tasnin Tesnin
Talbiseh Telbise
Deir Ful Derful
Ghantu Ganto
Zaafaraniyah Zafereni
Tadmur District Tedmür İlçesi
Palmyra Tedmür, Tedmir, Palmir, Palmira, Palmiye
Taldou District Teldu İlçesi
Houla Region Hule, Hula Türkmen Yöresi
Burj Qa'i Kala
Kafr Laha Kefr Laha, Kefer Laha
Karad Dayasinah El Kırad Dasniye
Samalil Semalil
Taldou Teldu
Tell Dahab Tel Dahab
Qabu Subdistrict
Qabu Kabu
Talkalakh District Telkele İlçesi
Hadidah Hadide
Hasrajiyah Hasırciye
Hawash Havaş
Krak des Chevaliers Hısnü'l-Ekrad
Marmarita Mermerita
Nasirah El Nasıra
Qaz al-Khass Kızıl Has
Talkalakh Telkele, Telkelek
Zarah Zare
Idlib Governorate İdlip İli
Ariha District Eriha İlçesi
Ariha Eriha
Ihsim İhsem, Ehsem, İhsim, Ehsim
Muhambal Mahambel, Muhambel
Harem District Harim İlçesi
Armanaz Subdistrict Ermenaz Beldesi
Armanaz Ermenaz, Ermenas
Dana Subdistrict Dana Beldesi
Atme Atme, Atma
Dana Dana, El Dana
Qah Kah
Salwah Salva
Sarmada Sarmada
Harem Subdistrict Harim Beldesi
Harem Harim, Harem
Kafr Takharim Subdistrict Kefer Taharim Beldesi
Kafr Takharim Kefer Taharim
Qurqania Subdistrict Korkaniye Beldesi
Barisha Barişa, Cebel-i Barişa
Qurqania Korkaniye, Kurkaniye, Kurkanya
Salqin Subdistrict Selkin Beldesi
Salqin Selkin, Salkin
Idlib District İdlip İlçesi
Abu al-Duhur Ebu el Duhur
Binnish Binniş
Ebla Ebla
Idlib İdlip
Maarrat Misrin Maaret el-Misrin
Mardikh Tel Merdik, Tel Mardik
Saraqib Serakıp
Sarmin Sermin
Taftanaz Teftenaz
Jisr al-Shughur District Cisr eş Şuğur İlçesi
Bidama Bedama
Darkush Dirkuş, Derkuş
Andnaniyeh - Farjein Vericine
Janudiyah Cenudiye, Canudiye
Jisr al-Shughur Cisr eş Şuğur, Cisr-i Şuğur
Sokkariyeh Kesir İde
Maarrat al-Nu'man District Mameratülnuman İlçesi
Heisa Heyte
Hish Hiş
Kafr Nabl Kefer Nebil, Kefer Nabul
Khan Shaykhun Han Şeyhun
Maarrat al-Nu'man Mameratülnuman, Maaret el Numan, Ma'arra, Ma'arretü'n-Nu'man
Sinjar Sencar, Sincar
Tamanah Temena, Temana
Latakia Governorate Lazkiye İli
Haffah District Haffa İlçesi
Citadel of Salah Ed-Din Sahyun, Selahattin Kalesi, Ziyon, Siyon
Haffah Haffa
Kinsabba Kinsebe, Kensebe, Kansaba, Kinsaba
Jableh District Cebeliye İlçesi
Bustan al-Basha Bostanpaşa
Jableh Cebeliye, Cebele, Ceble
Latakia District Lazkiye İlçesi
Bahluliyah Subdistrict Behlüliye Beldesi
Bahluliyah Behlüliye
Bayırbucak Bayırbucak, Bayırbucak Türkmen Yöresi
Ayn al-Bayda Subdistrict Akpınar Beldesi
Ayn al-Bayda Akpınar, Ayn el Beyda
Burj Islam Burç İslam
Mashqita Maşkite, Maşkita
Safsaf Safsaf
Salib al-Turkman Sılayip Türkmen, Salib el-Türkmen
Kessab Subdistrict Kesep Beldesi
Jebel Aqra Kel Dağı, Cebel-i Akra
Kessab Kesep, Keseb, Kesap
Aji Su Acısu
Baghjaghaz Bağcağaz
Bashurtah Başorta
Chakaljek Çakalcık
Chinar Çınar
Duzaghaj Düzağaç
Ekizolukh İkiz Oluk
Esguran İç Köy
Karadash Karataş
Karadouran Kara Turan, Karaduran
Kaslajuk Kışlacık
Keorkeuna Körküne
Sev Aghpyur Sahra
Qastal Ma'af Subdistrict Kastal Beldesi
Badrusiyah Bedrusiye
Qastal Ma'af Kastal, Kastel, Kastel Maaf, Kastal Maaf
Ras al-Bassit Basit Burnu
Umm al-Tuyour Turunç
Rabia Subdistrict Gebelli Beldesi
Rabia Gebelli, Rabia
Turkmen Mountain Türkmendağı, Türkmen Dağı
Latakia Subdistrict Latakya Beldesi
Burj al-Qasab Burç Kesep, Burc Keseb
Latakia Lazkiye, Lazikiye, Lazıkiye
Shamiyah Şamiye
Qardaha District Kardaha İlçesi
Qardaha Kardaha
Syrian Coastal Mountain Range Nusayriye Dağları, Alevi Dağları
Quneitra Governorate Kunteyra İli
Fiq District Fik İlçesi
Golan Heights Golan Tepeleri, Culan, Ceylan, Geylan
Quneitra District Kunteyra İlçesi
Ahmadiyah Ahmediye
Katzrin Kisrin, Kesrin
Madinat al-Baath Medinet el-Baas
Majdal Shams Mecdel-i Şems
Quneitra Kunteyra, Kuneytıra, Kunaytara, Kuneytira, Kuneytire
Raqqa Governorate Rakka İli
Raqqa District Rakka İlçesi
Raqqa Rakka
Tell Abyad District Tel Ebyaz İlçesi
Ayn Issa Ayn İsa, Bozani
Suluk Suluk
Tell Abyad Tel Ebyaz, Tel Abyad, Tellebyad, Gire Spi
Thawrah District Tebke İlçesi
Qal'at Ja'bar Caber Kalesi, Ceber Kalesi, Türk Mezarı
Thawrah Tebke, Tabka
Rif Dimashq Governorate Rif Şam İli
Darayya District Deraya İlçesi
Douma District Duma İlçesi
Harasta Harasta, Hirista
Ghouta Guta Yöresi
Markaz Rif Dimashq District Rif Şam İlçesi
Babbila Babila
Sayyidah Zaynab Seyyide Zeyneb, Seyyide Zeynep
Jaramana Ceramana
Malihah Meliha
Deir al-Asafir Deyr el Esafir
Nabek District Nebek İlçesi
Nabek Nebek
Qalamoun Cebel-i Kalmun
Qara Kara, Karalar
Qatana District Katana İlçesi
Mount Hermon Şeyh Dağı, Cebel el-Şeyh, Cebel Haramun, Cebelü' Şeyh, Cebel üş-Şeyh
Qatana Katana
Qutayfah District Kuteyfe İlçesi
Maaloula Malule
Qutayfah Kuteyfe, Küteyfe
Tall District El Tel İlçesi, El Tal
Hosh Arab Hoşarab
Yabroud District Yebrut İlçesi
Yabroud Yebrut, Yebrud
Zabadani District Zübdani İlçesi
Zabadani Zübdani
Suwayda Governorate Süveyde İli
Jabal al-Druze Cebel Dürzi, Cebel-i Dürüz, Dürzi Dağı
Salkhad District Salhad İlçesi
Salkhad Salhad
Shahba District Şahba İlçesi
Ariqah Arihe, Ahire
Shahba Şahba
Suwayda District Süveyde İlçesi
Hit Hit
Suwayda Süveyde, Süveydiye, Süveyda
Tartus Governorate Tartus İli
Baniyas District Banyas İlçesi
Baniyas Banyas, Baniyas
Basatin al-Assad Bisitin
Margat Merkep Kalesi
Safita District Şafite İlçesi
Mitras Zok Türkmen
Safita Şafite, Şafita, Safite
Shaykh Badr District Şeyh Bedir İlçesi
Shaykh Badr Şeyh Bedir
Tartus District Tartus İlçesi
Arwad Avrat Adası
Hamidiyah Hamidiye
Khawabi Havabi
Tartus Tartus, Antartus

Tajikistan

Tanzania

Tunisia
Aroussa El Araz
Ariana Aryana
Béja Bace, Ifrîkiyye maa Bâce, Bacce
Ben Arous Ben Arus
Bizerte Benzerte, Binzert, Benzert, Bekzert
Cape Negro Zenci Burnu, Karaburun
Carthage Kartaca
Chikly Sen Jak, San Jak
Douz Düz, Duz
Enfida Enfida
Gabès Kabes, Gabis
Gafsa Kafsa
Galite Islands Calte Adaları
Gulf of Gabès Gabis Körfezi
Hammam Ghezèze Hamam Oğuz, Oğuz Hamamı
Hammamet Hamamet, Kal'a-i Hamâme
Jem Cem, Lecm
Jendouba Cendube
Jerba Cerbe, Cerîd Cerbe, Cirbe
Kairouan Kayrevân, Kayravan
Kasserine Kassarin
Kebili Kabili
Kef Kâf, Kâf maa Amdûn, Kef
Kelibia Kalbiye, Kalıbiye, Kal'a-i Kalîbiya
Kerkennah Islands Karkana, Kekrene Adaları
La Goulette Halkulvad, Golta, Halkulvâdî, Halkü'l Vat, Halkul-Vad
La Marsa Marsa
Mahdia Mehdiye, Mahdiya, Mehdiyye
Manouba Manuba
Mateur Matar
Matmata Matmata
Medenine Medenin
Monastir Monastır
Nabeul Nabil, Nabul
Sfax İsfakus, İsfakız, İsfakus maa Kekrene, Safakes, Safakis
Sidi Bou Zid Sidi Bu Zeyd, Sidi Bu Seyit
Siliana Silyana
Soliman Dâhil maa Süleyman
Sousse Sus, Susa
Tabarka Tabarka
Tataouine Tatavin
Teboursouk Tabarsuk
Testour Testur
Tozeur Tuzer
Tunis Tunus
Zaghouan Zaguvan
Zarzis Zarzis

Turkey

Turkmenistan

Ukraine
Adziogol Lighthouse Acıgöl Denizfeneri
Almazna Elmas
Askania-Nova Büyük Çaplı, Büyük Çepni
Ataky Atak, Otağ, Otak
Azov Azak Denizi
Bakhmach Bahmaç
Bakhmut Mahmut
Balta Balta
Bar Bar
Baraboi River, Odessa Baraboy, Kanlısu, Kanayan Su
Baturyn Batur
Bazavluk River Bozukluk deresi, Pazarlık deresi
Berdyansk Kuturoğlu, Yeni Nogay, Berde, Berda
Berezan Estuary Büzülü Liman
Berezan Island Pirezin Adası, Bürüzen, Büzülü, Pirezen
Beryslav Kız Kermen, Kızı Kermen, Kız Kirman, Gazi Kerman, Gazi Kirman, Kazı Kirman, Gazikermen, Kızıl Kermen, Doğan Geçit, Doğan, Tavan
Bila Tserkva Piyaçerko (Akkilise), Piyale Sergü
Bilosaraiska Spit Aksaray Dili, Balı-Saray Dili
Braha, Khmelnytskyi Biraga
Buchach Bucaş
Burgunka Burgu
Bratslav Breşlav, Breslav
Cherkasy Çerikişi, Çigirin, Çerkes-Kirman
Chernihiv Karacar, Karajar, Karadjar
Chernivtsi Çernovi, Çernoviç, Çernavuç
Chonhar Çongar
Chonhar Peninsula Çongar Yarımadası
Chornomorsk Buh
Chornyi Ostriv Çornostra, Çornosturuf
Chortkiv Çortkuv
Chyhyryn Çehrin, Çihrin, Çigirin
Dalnyk River Dallık Nehri
Derazhnia Dıraşna, Dırajna
Desna River Seber-Su
Dnieper River Özi, Özü, Dinyeper, Buriçay
Dniester Turla, Dinyester, Torla, Torlu
Dniester Estuary Ovid Gölü, Hacıdere Gölü
Dnipro Köydağ, Kodak, Kudak, Koydak, Koydalık, Doğankale, Togay, Doğanhisar
Dofinivka Estuary Büyük Acalık Liman, Büyük Ağaçlık Liman
Donets River Küçük Şir, Küçük Sir, Kiçi-Şir
Dzharylhach Kırlangıç, Yarılgaç, Carılgaç
Galicia Galiçya
Halych Haliç, Galiç
Henichesk İnce, Yenice
Husiatyn Husateyn
Inhul River Yenigöl Deresi
Inhulets Yeni Gölet
Ivano-Frankivsk Taşlı Şehir
Izium Üzüm Kurgan, Üzüm
Kakhovka İslam Kermen, Şahin Giray, İslam Kirman, Şahin Kirman, Mübarek Kirman, Aslan Kirman, Aslan Kermen, Şah Kirman, Mamay Saray
Kakhovka Reservoir Can Kirman, Han Burun
Kalanchak Kalıncak, Kanlıcak
Kalmius Kalmus
Kamianets-Podilskyi Kamaniçe, Kameniçe, Kamaniçse
Kamianka-Dniprovska Kamanke
Kaniv Hanev
Kapustyne Kabuste
Karaholska Bay Karagöl Körfezi
Karolino Buhaz Boğaz
Kasperivtsi Kaşperofça, Kaşperofçe, Kasperofçe
Khadzhibey Estuary Hacıbey Limanı
Kharkiv Harkobe, Karak, Şarukan, Şeyh Ruh Han, Şeyhruhan, Harka, Karka
Kherson Herson, Kerson
Khmelnytskyi Poloskiruf, Polofkiruf, Poloskiruri
Khortytsia Ortaca, Orta Ada, Bayda
Khotyn Hotin, Hatın, Hotun, Hoten
Khropotova Horopotova
Khust Hust, Hostvar, Husvar
Kinburn Kılburun, Kilburun
Kitaihorod Kıtahorod, Kitahorod, Kitayhorad
Kremenchuk Kermencik, Kermençik
Kremenets Kremenis, Kremenes
Krivche Krifçe, Kırıvçe
Kropyvnytskyi İngul, Yenigöl
Kryvyi Rih Saksağan
Kuchurhan Kuçurgan, Kuruçukur, Göçürgen
Kuchurhan River Kuruçukur Deresi, Kuçurgan, Göçürgen
Kushuhum Küçük Kum
Kuyalnik Estuary Kuyanlık Liman
Kyiv Kiyev, Man Kirman, Kiyef, Kiyevya, Baştu, Bashtu, Sambatas, Zanbat
Ladyzhyn Ladjin
Letychiv Velatçu
Luhan River Leğen
Luhansk Leğen, Legen, Lagan
Lvov İlbav, Eylov, Livov, Lemberek, Lemberik, Lemberg, Lviv
Lyman Liman
Manhush Mankuş, Manguş
Mariupol Kalcık, Kalçık, Kalmiuz, Kalmus, Kalmus Palanka, Domaha, Balı-Saray
Medvedivka Medveduka
Melekine Melek
Melitopol Kızılyar
Medzhybizh Mejibuji, Meziboza
Mohyliv-Podilskyi Mohilo, Mıhaylov, Mihaylova
Mostyska Musteçka
Mukachevo Munkaç, Munkak
Mykolaiv Buğ Liman
Bug Estuary Buğ Liman, Aksu Liman
Nadlymanske Karagöl
Nemyriv Nimerova
Novhorod-Siverskyi Seber, Urus-Seber, Urus
Novi Sanzhary Yeni Sancar
Novokostyantyniv Konstantın, Konstantin
Novomoskovsk Samarcık
Ochakov Özi, Özü, Karakerman, Karakirman, Kara Kerman, Uzunkale, Ocak Kale, Ocak Kermen, Acı Kale, Can Kerman, Cankerman, Cankirman, Cangirman
Odessa Hacıbey, Hocabey, Kocabey, Koçubey, Yedisan, Kocabeyi, Ades
Khadjibey Hacıbey Kalesi
Okhtyrka Ak Tura, Aktırka
Okopy Akub
Oril River Eğri Deresi, Eğridere, Eğrili
Orlivka Kartal
Ovidiopol Hacıdere
Pavoloch Paliçe
Pervomaisk Orlık, Golta
Podolia Podolya
Podilsk Birzula
Pogorilivka Pohurluk
Poltava Baltavar, Poltova, Poltava
Popivtsi Popovçi, Popofçi
Primorskyi Hafuz
Pryazovske Azakönü
Prylymanske Tatar
Prymorsk Nogay
Putyvl Batavil, Korisdan, Horisdan, Horusdan, Korosten, Horysdan, Putivl
Rohatyn Rogatin
Rybakivka Hasan Kale, Acıyas
Saksahan River Saksağan Deresi
Samar Semer, Şamara
Samara River Semer Deresi, Samarcık
Sanzhiyka Sancak
Sataniv Satanova, Şeytanova
Seym River Süüm-İdil
Sharhorod Küçük İstanbul
Skadovsk Ali-Agok
Skala-Podilska İskala, İskele, Podolya İskelesi
Sloviansk Tork, Tor
Small Adzhalyk Estuary Küçük Acalık Liman, Küçük Ağaçlık Liman
Sniatyn Sinatin
Southern Bug Aksu, Buğ
Stakhanov Kadıköy
Stara Zburyivka Ordu-Bazar
Strilkove Çokrak
Sukhyi Liman Sığ Liman
Tavani Island Taban, Nusret Kermen, Nusret Kirman, Eski Taban
Terebovlia Trembula, Terebovlya, Terebolya, Trebevle, Trembovla
Tlumach Tolmaç, Dilmeç
Tokmak Tokmak
Tulchyn Tulçin, Nestervar
Tyahynka Doğan, Doğan Geçit, Togan, Divan Geçit, Tavan, Eski Tavan, Eski Doğan
Tylihul Estuary Deligöl Liman
Tylihul River Deligöl Deresi
Uman Uman, Kuman
Uzhhorod Ungvar, Unguyvar
Ustechko Yuvaniça
Velikodolinske, Ovidiopol Velika Akarca
Verbizh Verbiç, Verbic
Vinnytsia Vinniçe
Volhynia Volinya, Volhilina
Vynohradiv Seleş
Vysun River İçin Deresi
Yahorlyk Bay Yahorlık Koyu
Yahorlyk Kut Yahorlık Kut Yarımadası
Yaremche Yarımca
Yazlovets Yazlofça, Yazlofçe, Yazlovişte
Zaliztsi Zaloşça
Zaporizhia Sarı Kamış
Zbarazh İzbaraş, Izbaraz, Azbaras
Zhuravne İzvança, İzvançe, İzvanca, İjvan, İzvan
Zinkiv Zinkuv
Budjak Bucak, Tatar Bucağı, Güney Besarabya
Artsyz Arsız, Arçız
Balabanka, Tatarbunary Balabanköy
Bashtanivka, Tatarbunary Bahçeli
Bilhorod-Dnistrovskyi Akkerman, Akça Kirman, Turla
Bilolissya, Tatarbunary Akmangıt
Kotlovyna Bolboka
Bolhrad Bolgrad, Tabak, Palada
Dniester-Tsaregrad Strait Kara Boğaz
Izmail İsmail, İşmasıl, Hacidar, İsmailiye
Kiliya Kilya, Kili, Kilye
Lake Budaki Batak Göl, Aşağı Bağlar Gölü, Aşağı Bağ Gölü, Budak Gölü, Bucak Gölü
Lake Kitay Kıtay Gölü
Lake Kahul Kahul Gölü
Lake Kartal Kartal Gölü
Lake Katlabukh Katlabuk Gölü
Lake Kuhurluy Kovurlu Gölü
Lake Yalpuh Yalpuç Gölü, Yalpuk Gölü
Orlivka Kartal
Reni Reni, Tomarova
Sarata Sarata, Gura Kurudere
Semenivka, Akkerman Seymen
Snake Island Yılan Adası, Yılanlıada, Akada
Tarutyne Tarutin, Ançokrak
Tatarbunary Tatarpınarı
Udobne, Akkerman Han Kışla
Tuzly Lagoons Tuzlu Göller
Alibey Lagoon Alibey Gölü
Burnas Lagoon Burun Gölü
Dzhantshey Lagoon Cançay, Yeniçay
Karachaus Lagoon Karacahavuz Gölü, Karaçavuş
Khadzhyder Lagoon Hacıdere Gölü
Khadzhyder River Hacıdere
Kurudiol Lagoon Kurugöl
Mahala Lagoon Mahalle Gölü
Sasyk Lake Sasık Gölü, Kunduk Gölü
Shahany Lake Çagani Gölü, Şagani
Zatoka Boğaz
Crimea Kırım
Ai-Petri Aya Petri, Ay Petri
Alma River Alma Deresi, Elma, Almalu, Elmalı
Alupka Alupka
Alushta Aluşta
Andriyivka Akleyiz, Ekles, Aklez
Angarskyi Pass Angara Boğazı
Aqtas Lake Aktaş Gölü
Arabat Spit Arabat beli, Arabat dili, Rabat, Ribat, Arbat, Arpat
Armyansk Ermenibazar, Ermenipazar, Kalıncak, Kanlıcak
Ayu-Dag Ayı Dağ
Ayvazovskoe Şeyh Mamay, Şah Mamay
Bakhchisaray Bahçesaray, Bağçesaray
Balaklava Balıklıova, Balıklava, Balıklova, Balıklağı, Balıklağo
Balaklava Bay Balıklıova Körfezi
Baydar Gate Baydar Kapı
Baydar Valley Baydar Ova
Beregovoye Kuran Eli, Koran Eli
Bilohirsk Karasubazar, Karasupazar
Blyzhnye Bay Buğa, Baybuga
Cape Aya Aya Burun, Ayya Burnu
Cape Fiolent İyane Burnu, Fenar Burnu
Cape Fonar Fener Burnu, Akıntı Burnu
Chatyr-Dag Çatırdağ, Çadırdağ
Chersonesus Sarı Kirman, Sarı Kermen, Çerson, Korsun
Choban-Kule Çoban Kule
Chornaya River Çorhun, Çorna
Chornomorske Akmeçet, Akmecit, Akmeçit
Crimean Mountains Kırım Dağları
Çufut Qale Çufut Kale, Çiftkale, Çufud Kale, Çuhud Kale, Cufut Kale, Cevher Kirman, Gevherkermen, Gevherkirman, Potmay, Botmay, Kermencik, Kırk Yer, Kırk Er, Çıfıt Kale
Dalnye Eski Kamışlı
Demir-Kapu Demir Kapı
Devil's Gate Şeytan Kapı, Altın Kapı
Dzhankoy Canköy
Yevpatoria Gözleve, Kezlev, Kızılev
Feodosiya Kefe, Kafa
Foros Foros, Faros
Frontove Otarköy
Fruktove Belbek
Gaspra Gaspıra
Gurzuf Gurzuf
Heracles Peninsula Peltek Burnu
Hvardiiske Sarıbuz, Sarabuz
Inkerman İnkerman, İnkirman
Isthmus of Perekop Orkapı Kıstağı
Kacha Kaçı, Kaça, Kancaçay
Kamyanske Ak Manay
Kamyshly Kamışlı
Kara Dag Mountain Karadağ
Karkinit Bay Karkinit Koyu
Kazantyp Kazandip
Kerch Kerç, Agarca, Kireç, Ferş, Kerş, Karaş, Banjа-Kepe, Agardja
Kirovske İslam Terek, İslamdirek
Koktebel Koktebel, Köktebel, Köktebe
Koreiz Koreiz
Kozacha Bay Kozaça Körfezi
Krasnohvardiiske Kurman, Kurman-Kemelçi, Kurman-Kumelçi
Krasnokamianka Kızıltaş
Krasnoperekopsk Or Boynu
Krasnymak Eski Kermen
Kurortne Aşağı Otuz
Kuybysheve Albat
Lenine Yedikuyu
Livadiya Livatya, Livadiye
Mangup Mangupkale, Menkub, Mengub, Mankup, Mankub
Massandra Masandıra
Morske Kapsihor
Mount Mithridat Mitridat Tepe
Nikita Nikita
Novoozerne İbraş Eli
Novyi Svet Yeni Dünya
Nyzhnohirskyi Seyitler
Oktiabrske Büyük Onlar
Ordzhonikidze Kaygador
Orlivka Mamaşay
Panticapaeum Pantikapa, Pantikapey
Parkove Yeni Küçükköy
Partenit Partenit
Perekop Orkapı, Or, Ferah Kerman, Ferahkirman
Pervomayske Curçi, Curçı
Poliushko Polüşko
Ponyzivka Aşağı Kikineiz
Port of Sevastopol Oltiye Limanı, Kadı Liman, Kalamita Limanı
Poshtove Bazarcık, Pazarcık
Prymorskyi Hafuz, Hafız
Pyrohovka Acıköy
Roman-Kosh Roman Koş
Rozdolne Akşeyh
Saky Sak
Salhir River Salgır Nehri
Sarych Sarıç
Sevastopol Akyar, Aktıyar, Sarıkirman, Sarı Kirman, Sivastopol
Sevastopol Bay Akyar Körfezi, İnkerman Körfezi
Shchebetovka Otuz
Shcholkine Boyar
Simeiz Simeiz, Simeyz
Simferopol Akmescit
Sovietske Dolossı
Sovietskyi İçki, Sultan
Stary Krym Eski Kırım, Solhat, Salkat, Kırım Kirman, Kırım-i Atik
Sudak Sudak, Suğdak, Soğdak, Tat Eli, Tat İli
Sviderski Orta Kesek
Swallow's Nest Kırlangıç Yuvası, Karılgaç Yuvası
Syvash Çürüksu, Çürük Deniz, Sıvaş, Suvaş
Tarkhankut Peninsula Tarhan Kut, Tarhankut Yarımadası
Tuzla Island Tuzla Adası
Uchan-su (river) Uçan Su Deresi
Uchan-su (waterfall) Uçan Su Çağlayanı
Uhlove Hacı Bolat
Verkhnyosadove Duvanköy, Divanköy
Vynohradne Kurubaş
Vyshneve Eski Eli
Yalta Yalta, Yalıdağ, Yalıtay
Yeni-Kale Yenikale, Kal'a-ı Cedid, Kale-yi Cedid

United Arab Emirates

United Kingdom

United States

Uzbekistan

Vatican City

Yemen

See also
List of European exonyms
List of Azerbaijani Turkish exonyms

References

Turkish